

281001–281100 

|-bgcolor=#E9E9E9
| 281001 ||  || — || February 25, 2006 || Kitt Peak || Spacewatch || — || align=right | 1.7 km || 
|-id=002 bgcolor=#E9E9E9
| 281002 ||  || — || February 27, 2006 || Mount Lemmon || Mount Lemmon Survey || MRX || align=right | 1.3 km || 
|-id=003 bgcolor=#E9E9E9
| 281003 ||  || — || February 27, 2006 || Kitt Peak || Spacewatch || — || align=right | 2.3 km || 
|-id=004 bgcolor=#E9E9E9
| 281004 ||  || — || February 27, 2006 || Kitt Peak || Spacewatch || — || align=right | 2.9 km || 
|-id=005 bgcolor=#E9E9E9
| 281005 ||  || — || February 27, 2006 || Kitt Peak || Spacewatch || — || align=right | 3.0 km || 
|-id=006 bgcolor=#E9E9E9
| 281006 ||  || — || February 23, 2006 || Anderson Mesa || LONEOS || — || align=right | 2.2 km || 
|-id=007 bgcolor=#d6d6d6
| 281007 ||  || — || February 27, 2006 || Catalina || CSS || TRE || align=right | 5.1 km || 
|-id=008 bgcolor=#d6d6d6
| 281008 ||  || — || February 25, 2006 || Kitt Peak || Spacewatch || — || align=right | 4.3 km || 
|-id=009 bgcolor=#E9E9E9
| 281009 ||  || — || February 25, 2006 || Kitt Peak || Spacewatch || — || align=right | 2.4 km || 
|-id=010 bgcolor=#E9E9E9
| 281010 ||  || — || February 25, 2006 || Mount Lemmon || Mount Lemmon Survey || JUN || align=right | 1.4 km || 
|-id=011 bgcolor=#E9E9E9
| 281011 ||  || — || March 2, 2006 || Kitt Peak || Spacewatch || — || align=right | 1.4 km || 
|-id=012 bgcolor=#E9E9E9
| 281012 ||  || — || March 2, 2006 || Kitt Peak || Spacewatch || — || align=right | 1.3 km || 
|-id=013 bgcolor=#E9E9E9
| 281013 ||  || — || March 2, 2006 || Kitt Peak || Spacewatch || NEM || align=right | 2.6 km || 
|-id=014 bgcolor=#E9E9E9
| 281014 ||  || — || March 3, 2006 || Kitt Peak || Spacewatch || — || align=right | 3.1 km || 
|-id=015 bgcolor=#E9E9E9
| 281015 ||  || — || March 3, 2006 || Mount Lemmon || Mount Lemmon Survey || — || align=right | 1.8 km || 
|-id=016 bgcolor=#E9E9E9
| 281016 ||  || — || March 3, 2006 || Kitt Peak || Spacewatch || WIT || align=right | 1.2 km || 
|-id=017 bgcolor=#E9E9E9
| 281017 ||  || — || March 5, 2006 || Kitt Peak || Spacewatch || HNS || align=right | 1.5 km || 
|-id=018 bgcolor=#E9E9E9
| 281018 ||  || — || March 5, 2006 || Kitt Peak || Spacewatch || — || align=right | 2.3 km || 
|-id=019 bgcolor=#E9E9E9
| 281019 ||  || — || March 5, 2006 || Kitt Peak || Spacewatch || — || align=right | 2.6 km || 
|-id=020 bgcolor=#E9E9E9
| 281020 ||  || — || March 5, 2006 || Kitt Peak || Spacewatch || GEF || align=right | 1.3 km || 
|-id=021 bgcolor=#E9E9E9
| 281021 ||  || — || March 2, 2006 || Kitt Peak || M. W. Buie || — || align=right | 1.4 km || 
|-id=022 bgcolor=#fefefe
| 281022 ||  || — || March 9, 2006 || Catalina || CSS || H || align=right | 1.0 km || 
|-id=023 bgcolor=#d6d6d6
| 281023 ||  || — || March 23, 2006 || Mount Lemmon || Mount Lemmon Survey || EUP || align=right | 3.8 km || 
|-id=024 bgcolor=#d6d6d6
| 281024 ||  || — || March 25, 2006 || Kitt Peak || Spacewatch || K-2 || align=right | 2.0 km || 
|-id=025 bgcolor=#E9E9E9
| 281025 || 2006 GR || — || April 2, 2006 || Piszkéstető || K. Sárneczky || WIT || align=right | 1.0 km || 
|-id=026 bgcolor=#E9E9E9
| 281026 ||  || — || April 2, 2006 || Kitt Peak || Spacewatch || — || align=right | 2.8 km || 
|-id=027 bgcolor=#E9E9E9
| 281027 ||  || — || April 2, 2006 || Kitt Peak || Spacewatch || AGN || align=right | 1.5 km || 
|-id=028 bgcolor=#E9E9E9
| 281028 ||  || — || April 2, 2006 || Kitt Peak || Spacewatch || AGN || align=right | 1.5 km || 
|-id=029 bgcolor=#E9E9E9
| 281029 ||  || — || April 2, 2006 || Kitt Peak || Spacewatch || — || align=right | 3.2 km || 
|-id=030 bgcolor=#E9E9E9
| 281030 ||  || — || April 2, 2006 || Mount Lemmon || Mount Lemmon Survey || — || align=right | 3.4 km || 
|-id=031 bgcolor=#E9E9E9
| 281031 ||  || — || April 8, 2006 || Kitt Peak || Spacewatch || MRX || align=right | 1.4 km || 
|-id=032 bgcolor=#d6d6d6
| 281032 ||  || — || April 8, 2006 || Kitt Peak || Spacewatch || KOR || align=right | 1.6 km || 
|-id=033 bgcolor=#E9E9E9
| 281033 ||  || — || April 19, 2006 || Kitt Peak || Spacewatch || MRX || align=right | 1.2 km || 
|-id=034 bgcolor=#E9E9E9
| 281034 ||  || — || April 19, 2006 || Mount Lemmon || Mount Lemmon Survey || MRX || align=right | 1.3 km || 
|-id=035 bgcolor=#E9E9E9
| 281035 ||  || — || April 20, 2006 || Kitt Peak || Spacewatch || DOR || align=right | 2.7 km || 
|-id=036 bgcolor=#d6d6d6
| 281036 ||  || — || April 20, 2006 || Kitt Peak || Spacewatch || — || align=right | 2.4 km || 
|-id=037 bgcolor=#E9E9E9
| 281037 ||  || — || April 20, 2006 || Kitt Peak || Spacewatch || HOF || align=right | 3.2 km || 
|-id=038 bgcolor=#d6d6d6
| 281038 ||  || — || April 20, 2006 || Kitt Peak || Spacewatch || — || align=right | 3.3 km || 
|-id=039 bgcolor=#d6d6d6
| 281039 ||  || — || April 21, 2006 || Kitt Peak || Spacewatch || TIR || align=right | 3.8 km || 
|-id=040 bgcolor=#d6d6d6
| 281040 ||  || — || April 21, 2006 || Kitt Peak || Spacewatch || — || align=right | 3.0 km || 
|-id=041 bgcolor=#E9E9E9
| 281041 ||  || — || April 20, 2006 || Kitt Peak || Spacewatch || — || align=right | 3.3 km || 
|-id=042 bgcolor=#E9E9E9
| 281042 ||  || — || April 26, 2006 || Kitt Peak || Spacewatch || — || align=right | 2.8 km || 
|-id=043 bgcolor=#E9E9E9
| 281043 ||  || — || April 26, 2006 || Reedy Creek || J. Broughton || — || align=right | 2.3 km || 
|-id=044 bgcolor=#E9E9E9
| 281044 ||  || — || April 26, 2006 || Anderson Mesa || LONEOS || MRX || align=right | 1.5 km || 
|-id=045 bgcolor=#d6d6d6
| 281045 ||  || — || April 24, 2006 || Kitt Peak || Spacewatch || KOR || align=right | 1.3 km || 
|-id=046 bgcolor=#E9E9E9
| 281046 ||  || — || January 13, 2005 || Catalina || CSS || HNS || align=right | 2.3 km || 
|-id=047 bgcolor=#d6d6d6
| 281047 ||  || — || April 26, 2006 || Siding Spring || SSS || — || align=right | 3.4 km || 
|-id=048 bgcolor=#E9E9E9
| 281048 ||  || — || April 26, 2006 || Mount Lemmon || Mount Lemmon Survey || AGN || align=right | 1.2 km || 
|-id=049 bgcolor=#d6d6d6
| 281049 ||  || — || April 24, 2006 || Anderson Mesa || Spacewatch || — || align=right | 2.3 km || 
|-id=050 bgcolor=#d6d6d6
| 281050 ||  || — || April 26, 2006 || Cerro Tololo || M. W. Buie || K-2 || align=right | 1.6 km || 
|-id=051 bgcolor=#E9E9E9
| 281051 ||  || — || April 26, 2006 || Cerro Tololo || M. W. Buie || — || align=right | 2.2 km || 
|-id=052 bgcolor=#d6d6d6
| 281052 ||  || — || April 20, 2006 || Kitt Peak || Spacewatch || KOR || align=right | 1.7 km || 
|-id=053 bgcolor=#d6d6d6
| 281053 ||  || — || May 1, 2006 || Kitt Peak || Spacewatch || EOS || align=right | 2.2 km || 
|-id=054 bgcolor=#d6d6d6
| 281054 ||  || — || May 2, 2006 || Kitt Peak || Spacewatch || — || align=right | 3.1 km || 
|-id=055 bgcolor=#d6d6d6
| 281055 ||  || — || May 6, 2006 || Mount Lemmon || Mount Lemmon Survey || — || align=right | 4.2 km || 
|-id=056 bgcolor=#E9E9E9
| 281056 ||  || — || May 1, 2006 || Kitt Peak || M. W. Buie || HEN || align=right | 1.0 km || 
|-id=057 bgcolor=#d6d6d6
| 281057 ||  || — || May 19, 2006 || Mount Lemmon || Mount Lemmon Survey || EOS || align=right | 2.0 km || 
|-id=058 bgcolor=#d6d6d6
| 281058 ||  || — || May 19, 2006 || Mount Lemmon || Mount Lemmon Survey || — || align=right | 2.3 km || 
|-id=059 bgcolor=#d6d6d6
| 281059 ||  || — || May 20, 2006 || Kitt Peak || Spacewatch || — || align=right | 4.5 km || 
|-id=060 bgcolor=#E9E9E9
| 281060 ||  || — || May 20, 2006 || Kitt Peak || Spacewatch || — || align=right | 3.0 km || 
|-id=061 bgcolor=#d6d6d6
| 281061 ||  || — || May 20, 2006 || Kitt Peak || Spacewatch || — || align=right | 3.7 km || 
|-id=062 bgcolor=#d6d6d6
| 281062 ||  || — || May 20, 2006 || Kitt Peak || Spacewatch || KOR || align=right | 1.9 km || 
|-id=063 bgcolor=#d6d6d6
| 281063 ||  || — || May 21, 2006 || Mount Lemmon || Mount Lemmon Survey || KOR || align=right | 1.5 km || 
|-id=064 bgcolor=#d6d6d6
| 281064 ||  || — || May 23, 2006 || Kitt Peak || Spacewatch || TRP || align=right | 3.0 km || 
|-id=065 bgcolor=#d6d6d6
| 281065 ||  || — || May 20, 2006 || Palomar || NEAT || BRA || align=right | 2.1 km || 
|-id=066 bgcolor=#d6d6d6
| 281066 ||  || — || May 22, 2006 || Kitt Peak || Spacewatch || — || align=right | 2.5 km || 
|-id=067 bgcolor=#d6d6d6
| 281067 ||  || — || May 25, 2006 || Mauna Kea || P. A. Wiegert || EUP || align=right | 6.4 km || 
|-id=068 bgcolor=#d6d6d6
| 281068 Chipolin ||  ||  || July 18, 2006 || Lulin Observatory || H.-C. Lin, Q.-z. Ye || URS || align=right | 4.9 km || 
|-id=069 bgcolor=#d6d6d6
| 281069 ||  || — || July 25, 2006 || Ottmarsheim || C. Rinner || — || align=right | 5.0 km || 
|-id=070 bgcolor=#FFC2E0
| 281070 ||  || — || July 21, 2006 || Mauna Kea || D. J. Tholen || APOcritical || align=right data-sort-value="0.65" | 650 m || 
|-id=071 bgcolor=#d6d6d6
| 281071 || 2006 PM || — || August 6, 2006 || Pla D'Arguines || R. Ferrando || — || align=right | 5.2 km || 
|-id=072 bgcolor=#d6d6d6
| 281072 ||  || — || August 14, 2006 || Palomar || NEAT || — || align=right | 3.2 km || 
|-id=073 bgcolor=#d6d6d6
| 281073 ||  || — || August 24, 2006 || Palomar || NEAT || — || align=right | 4.3 km || 
|-id=074 bgcolor=#E9E9E9
| 281074 ||  || — || August 28, 2006 || Socorro || LINEAR || — || align=right | 3.1 km || 
|-id=075 bgcolor=#d6d6d6
| 281075 ||  || — || August 29, 2006 || Catalina || CSS || — || align=right | 3.2 km || 
|-id=076 bgcolor=#fefefe
| 281076 ||  || — || August 29, 2006 || Anderson Mesa || LONEOS || H || align=right data-sort-value="0.80" | 800 m || 
|-id=077 bgcolor=#E9E9E9
| 281077 ||  || — || August 28, 2006 || Goodricke-Pigott || R. A. Tucker || — || align=right | 1.7 km || 
|-id=078 bgcolor=#d6d6d6
| 281078 ||  || — || August 18, 2006 || Palomar || NEAT || HYG || align=right | 3.3 km || 
|-id=079 bgcolor=#d6d6d6
| 281079 ||  || — || September 14, 2006 || Kitt Peak || Spacewatch || 7:4 || align=right | 3.7 km || 
|-id=080 bgcolor=#d6d6d6
| 281080 ||  || — || September 12, 2006 || Catalina || CSS || TIR || align=right | 5.1 km || 
|-id=081 bgcolor=#d6d6d6
| 281081 ||  || — || September 14, 2006 || Palomar || NEAT || — || align=right | 4.3 km || 
|-id=082 bgcolor=#d6d6d6
| 281082 ||  || — || September 17, 2006 || Catalina || CSS || 7:4 || align=right | 4.5 km || 
|-id=083 bgcolor=#d6d6d6
| 281083 ||  || — || September 18, 2006 || Catalina || CSS || — || align=right | 3.8 km || 
|-id=084 bgcolor=#fefefe
| 281084 ||  || — || September 16, 2006 || Catalina || CSS || H || align=right data-sort-value="0.59" | 590 m || 
|-id=085 bgcolor=#fefefe
| 281085 ||  || — || September 21, 2006 || Anderson Mesa || LONEOS || H || align=right data-sort-value="0.75" | 750 m || 
|-id=086 bgcolor=#E9E9E9
| 281086 ||  || — || September 25, 2006 || Socorro || LINEAR || — || align=right | 3.5 km || 
|-id=087 bgcolor=#d6d6d6
| 281087 ||  || — || September 26, 2006 || Kitt Peak || Spacewatch || — || align=right | 2.9 km || 
|-id=088 bgcolor=#d6d6d6
| 281088 ||  || — || September 28, 2006 || Catalina || CSS || — || align=right | 7.1 km || 
|-id=089 bgcolor=#E9E9E9
| 281089 ||  || — || September 27, 2006 || Mount Lemmon || Mount Lemmon Survey || HOF || align=right | 2.6 km || 
|-id=090 bgcolor=#d6d6d6
| 281090 ||  || — || October 11, 2006 || Palomar || NEAT || — || align=right | 4.3 km || 
|-id=091 bgcolor=#d6d6d6
| 281091 ||  || — || October 15, 2006 || Kitt Peak || Spacewatch || EOS || align=right | 3.1 km || 
|-id=092 bgcolor=#d6d6d6
| 281092 ||  || — || October 12, 2006 || Apache Point || A. C. Becker || — || align=right | 3.6 km || 
|-id=093 bgcolor=#d6d6d6
| 281093 ||  || — || October 19, 2006 || Kitt Peak || Spacewatch || — || align=right | 4.1 km || 
|-id=094 bgcolor=#d6d6d6
| 281094 ||  || — || October 23, 2006 || Kitt Peak || Spacewatch || VER || align=right | 4.5 km || 
|-id=095 bgcolor=#E9E9E9
| 281095 ||  || — || October 16, 2006 || Catalina || CSS || ADE || align=right | 3.0 km || 
|-id=096 bgcolor=#d6d6d6
| 281096 ||  || — || October 27, 2006 || Kitt Peak || Spacewatch || VER || align=right | 3.7 km || 
|-id=097 bgcolor=#d6d6d6
| 281097 ||  || — || October 19, 2006 || Catalina || CSS || — || align=right | 4.5 km || 
|-id=098 bgcolor=#E9E9E9
| 281098 ||  || — || November 10, 2006 || Kitt Peak || Spacewatch || DOR || align=right | 2.5 km || 
|-id=099 bgcolor=#fefefe
| 281099 ||  || — || November 11, 2006 || Kitt Peak || Spacewatch || — || align=right data-sort-value="0.68" | 680 m || 
|-id=100 bgcolor=#E9E9E9
| 281100 ||  || — || November 16, 2006 || Socorro || LINEAR || — || align=right | 3.5 km || 
|}

281101–281200 

|-bgcolor=#fefefe
| 281101 ||  || — || November 17, 2006 || Socorro || LINEAR || — || align=right | 1.2 km || 
|-id=102 bgcolor=#fefefe
| 281102 ||  || — || November 18, 2006 || Kitt Peak || Spacewatch || NYS || align=right data-sort-value="0.66" | 660 m || 
|-id=103 bgcolor=#d6d6d6
| 281103 ||  || — || November 18, 2006 || Kitt Peak || Spacewatch || 3:2 || align=right | 8.1 km || 
|-id=104 bgcolor=#fefefe
| 281104 ||  || — || November 22, 2006 || Mount Lemmon || Mount Lemmon Survey || — || align=right data-sort-value="0.88" | 880 m || 
|-id=105 bgcolor=#E9E9E9
| 281105 ||  || — || November 20, 2006 || Catalina || CSS || — || align=right | 3.4 km || 
|-id=106 bgcolor=#fefefe
| 281106 ||  || — || December 13, 2006 || Mount Lemmon || Mount Lemmon Survey || — || align=right data-sort-value="0.90" | 900 m || 
|-id=107 bgcolor=#d6d6d6
| 281107 ||  || — || December 15, 2006 || Catalina || CSS || EUP || align=right | 6.9 km || 
|-id=108 bgcolor=#fefefe
| 281108 ||  || — || December 17, 2006 || 7300 Observatory || W. K. Y. Yeung || — || align=right data-sort-value="0.67" | 670 m || 
|-id=109 bgcolor=#fefefe
| 281109 ||  || — || December 21, 2006 || Kitt Peak || Spacewatch || — || align=right data-sort-value="0.86" | 860 m || 
|-id=110 bgcolor=#fefefe
| 281110 ||  || — || January 8, 2007 || Mount Lemmon || Mount Lemmon Survey || — || align=right data-sort-value="0.94" | 940 m || 
|-id=111 bgcolor=#fefefe
| 281111 ||  || — || January 9, 2007 || Kitt Peak || Spacewatch || — || align=right | 1.1 km || 
|-id=112 bgcolor=#fefefe
| 281112 ||  || — || January 9, 2007 || Mount Lemmon || Mount Lemmon Survey || — || align=right data-sort-value="0.78" | 780 m || 
|-id=113 bgcolor=#fefefe
| 281113 ||  || — || January 15, 2007 || Anderson Mesa || LONEOS || — || align=right | 1.00 km || 
|-id=114 bgcolor=#fefefe
| 281114 ||  || — || January 17, 2007 || Kitt Peak || Spacewatch || FLO || align=right data-sort-value="0.68" | 680 m || 
|-id=115 bgcolor=#fefefe
| 281115 ||  || — || January 17, 2007 || Kitt Peak || Spacewatch || NYS || align=right data-sort-value="0.88" | 880 m || 
|-id=116 bgcolor=#fefefe
| 281116 ||  || — || January 23, 2007 || Anderson Mesa || LONEOS || ERI || align=right | 2.1 km || 
|-id=117 bgcolor=#fefefe
| 281117 ||  || — || January 24, 2007 || Mount Lemmon || Mount Lemmon Survey || — || align=right data-sort-value="0.97" | 970 m || 
|-id=118 bgcolor=#fefefe
| 281118 ||  || — || January 26, 2007 || Kitt Peak || Spacewatch || NYS || align=right data-sort-value="0.82" | 820 m || 
|-id=119 bgcolor=#fefefe
| 281119 ||  || — || January 26, 2007 || Kitt Peak || Spacewatch || — || align=right | 1.1 km || 
|-id=120 bgcolor=#E9E9E9
| 281120 ||  || — || January 23, 2007 || Socorro || LINEAR || — || align=right | 1.5 km || 
|-id=121 bgcolor=#fefefe
| 281121 ||  || — || January 24, 2007 || Kitt Peak || Spacewatch || — || align=right data-sort-value="0.81" | 810 m || 
|-id=122 bgcolor=#fefefe
| 281122 ||  || — || January 24, 2007 || Socorro || LINEAR || MAS || align=right | 1.0 km || 
|-id=123 bgcolor=#fefefe
| 281123 ||  || — || January 27, 2007 || Mount Lemmon || Mount Lemmon Survey || FLO || align=right data-sort-value="0.99" | 990 m || 
|-id=124 bgcolor=#E9E9E9
| 281124 ||  || — || January 27, 2007 || Mount Lemmon || Mount Lemmon Survey || — || align=right | 3.1 km || 
|-id=125 bgcolor=#fefefe
| 281125 ||  || — || January 27, 2007 || Mount Lemmon || Mount Lemmon Survey || — || align=right | 1.1 km || 
|-id=126 bgcolor=#fefefe
| 281126 ||  || — || January 27, 2007 || Mount Lemmon || Mount Lemmon Survey || — || align=right | 1.0 km || 
|-id=127 bgcolor=#fefefe
| 281127 ||  || — || January 24, 2007 || Mount Lemmon || Mount Lemmon Survey || FLO || align=right data-sort-value="0.74" | 740 m || 
|-id=128 bgcolor=#fefefe
| 281128 ||  || — || February 8, 2007 || Mount Lemmon || Mount Lemmon Survey || — || align=right data-sort-value="0.94" | 940 m || 
|-id=129 bgcolor=#fefefe
| 281129 ||  || — || February 7, 2007 || Catalina || CSS || — || align=right | 1.1 km || 
|-id=130 bgcolor=#fefefe
| 281130 ||  || — || February 6, 2007 || Palomar || NEAT || — || align=right data-sort-value="0.79" | 790 m || 
|-id=131 bgcolor=#fefefe
| 281131 ||  || — || February 6, 2007 || Mount Lemmon || Mount Lemmon Survey || — || align=right data-sort-value="0.85" | 850 m || 
|-id=132 bgcolor=#fefefe
| 281132 ||  || — || February 8, 2007 || Palomar || NEAT || FLO || align=right data-sort-value="0.75" | 750 m || 
|-id=133 bgcolor=#fefefe
| 281133 ||  || — || February 8, 2007 || Palomar || NEAT || FLO || align=right data-sort-value="0.68" | 680 m || 
|-id=134 bgcolor=#E9E9E9
| 281134 ||  || — || February 9, 2007 || Kitt Peak || Spacewatch || — || align=right | 2.5 km || 
|-id=135 bgcolor=#fefefe
| 281135 ||  || — || February 10, 2007 || Catalina || CSS || V || align=right data-sort-value="0.85" | 850 m || 
|-id=136 bgcolor=#fefefe
| 281136 ||  || — || February 10, 2007 || Palomar || NEAT || V || align=right data-sort-value="0.80" | 800 m || 
|-id=137 bgcolor=#E9E9E9
| 281137 ||  || — || February 10, 2007 || Catalina || CSS || JUN || align=right | 1.4 km || 
|-id=138 bgcolor=#fefefe
| 281138 ||  || — || February 16, 2007 || Catalina || CSS || FLO || align=right | 1.6 km || 
|-id=139 bgcolor=#E9E9E9
| 281139 ||  || — || February 19, 2007 || Mayhill || A. Lowe || — || align=right | 1.4 km || 
|-id=140 bgcolor=#fefefe
| 281140 Trier ||  ||  || February 16, 2007 || Taunus || E. Schwab, R. Kling || — || align=right | 1.0 km || 
|-id=141 bgcolor=#fefefe
| 281141 ||  || — || February 16, 2007 || Mount Lemmon || Mount Lemmon Survey || — || align=right | 1.7 km || 
|-id=142 bgcolor=#fefefe
| 281142 ||  || — || February 17, 2007 || Kitt Peak || Spacewatch || — || align=right data-sort-value="0.91" | 910 m || 
|-id=143 bgcolor=#fefefe
| 281143 ||  || — || February 17, 2007 || Kitt Peak || Spacewatch || — || align=right data-sort-value="0.77" | 770 m || 
|-id=144 bgcolor=#fefefe
| 281144 ||  || — || February 17, 2007 || Kitt Peak || Spacewatch || MAS || align=right data-sort-value="0.79" | 790 m || 
|-id=145 bgcolor=#fefefe
| 281145 ||  || — || February 19, 2007 || Mount Lemmon || Mount Lemmon Survey || — || align=right | 1.2 km || 
|-id=146 bgcolor=#fefefe
| 281146 ||  || — || February 17, 2007 || Kitt Peak || Spacewatch || V || align=right data-sort-value="0.78" | 780 m || 
|-id=147 bgcolor=#fefefe
| 281147 ||  || — || February 17, 2007 || Catalina || CSS || — || align=right | 1.7 km || 
|-id=148 bgcolor=#fefefe
| 281148 ||  || — || February 21, 2007 || Socorro || LINEAR || ERI || align=right | 1.8 km || 
|-id=149 bgcolor=#fefefe
| 281149 ||  || — || February 21, 2007 || Mount Lemmon || Mount Lemmon Survey || FLO || align=right data-sort-value="0.89" | 890 m || 
|-id=150 bgcolor=#fefefe
| 281150 ||  || — || February 21, 2007 || Kitt Peak || Spacewatch || NYS || align=right data-sort-value="0.79" | 790 m || 
|-id=151 bgcolor=#E9E9E9
| 281151 ||  || — || February 21, 2007 || Kitt Peak || Spacewatch || — || align=right | 1.7 km || 
|-id=152 bgcolor=#fefefe
| 281152 ||  || — || February 21, 2007 || Mount Lemmon || Mount Lemmon Survey || MAS || align=right data-sort-value="0.68" | 680 m || 
|-id=153 bgcolor=#fefefe
| 281153 ||  || — || February 23, 2007 || Kitt Peak || Spacewatch || — || align=right data-sort-value="0.97" | 970 m || 
|-id=154 bgcolor=#fefefe
| 281154 ||  || — || February 23, 2007 || Mount Lemmon || Mount Lemmon Survey || MAS || align=right data-sort-value="0.73" | 730 m || 
|-id=155 bgcolor=#fefefe
| 281155 ||  || — || February 23, 2007 || Kitt Peak || Spacewatch || NYS || align=right data-sort-value="0.87" | 870 m || 
|-id=156 bgcolor=#fefefe
| 281156 ||  || — || February 25, 2007 || Mount Lemmon || Mount Lemmon Survey || MAS || align=right data-sort-value="0.88" | 880 m || 
|-id=157 bgcolor=#E9E9E9
| 281157 ||  || — || February 27, 2007 || Catalina || CSS || — || align=right | 2.3 km || 
|-id=158 bgcolor=#fefefe
| 281158 ||  || — || February 23, 2007 || Mount Lemmon || Mount Lemmon Survey || EUT || align=right data-sort-value="0.70" | 700 m || 
|-id=159 bgcolor=#fefefe
| 281159 ||  || — || February 21, 2007 || Mount Lemmon || Mount Lemmon Survey || — || align=right data-sort-value="0.83" | 830 m || 
|-id=160 bgcolor=#fefefe
| 281160 ||  || — || March 9, 2007 || Catalina || CSS || NYS || align=right data-sort-value="0.72" | 720 m || 
|-id=161 bgcolor=#fefefe
| 281161 ||  || — || March 9, 2007 || Mount Lemmon || Mount Lemmon Survey || FLO || align=right data-sort-value="0.80" | 800 m || 
|-id=162 bgcolor=#fefefe
| 281162 ||  || — || March 9, 2007 || Catalina || CSS || NYS || align=right | 2.0 km || 
|-id=163 bgcolor=#fefefe
| 281163 ||  || — || March 9, 2007 || Kitt Peak || Spacewatch || V || align=right data-sort-value="0.72" | 720 m || 
|-id=164 bgcolor=#fefefe
| 281164 ||  || — || March 10, 2007 || Mount Lemmon || Mount Lemmon Survey || NYS || align=right data-sort-value="0.94" | 940 m || 
|-id=165 bgcolor=#fefefe
| 281165 ||  || — || March 10, 2007 || Palomar || NEAT || — || align=right | 1.1 km || 
|-id=166 bgcolor=#fefefe
| 281166 ||  || — || March 10, 2007 || Palomar || NEAT || NYS || align=right data-sort-value="0.76" | 760 m || 
|-id=167 bgcolor=#E9E9E9
| 281167 ||  || — || March 12, 2007 || Kleť || Kleť Obs. || — || align=right | 2.6 km || 
|-id=168 bgcolor=#fefefe
| 281168 ||  || — || March 9, 2007 || Kitt Peak || Spacewatch || MAS || align=right data-sort-value="0.93" | 930 m || 
|-id=169 bgcolor=#fefefe
| 281169 ||  || — || March 9, 2007 || Kitt Peak || Spacewatch || — || align=right data-sort-value="0.94" | 940 m || 
|-id=170 bgcolor=#fefefe
| 281170 ||  || — || March 9, 2007 || Kitt Peak || Spacewatch || V || align=right data-sort-value="0.95" | 950 m || 
|-id=171 bgcolor=#E9E9E9
| 281171 ||  || — || March 9, 2007 || Kitt Peak || Spacewatch || — || align=right | 2.7 km || 
|-id=172 bgcolor=#fefefe
| 281172 ||  || — || March 9, 2007 || Kitt Peak || Spacewatch || MAS || align=right data-sort-value="0.85" | 850 m || 
|-id=173 bgcolor=#fefefe
| 281173 ||  || — || March 9, 2007 || Kitt Peak || Spacewatch || NYS || align=right data-sort-value="0.81" | 810 m || 
|-id=174 bgcolor=#fefefe
| 281174 ||  || — || March 10, 2007 || Kitt Peak || Spacewatch || MAS || align=right data-sort-value="0.94" | 940 m || 
|-id=175 bgcolor=#E9E9E9
| 281175 ||  || — || March 10, 2007 || Kitt Peak || Spacewatch || — || align=right | 2.1 km || 
|-id=176 bgcolor=#fefefe
| 281176 ||  || — || March 10, 2007 || Kitt Peak || Spacewatch || NYS || align=right data-sort-value="0.81" | 810 m || 
|-id=177 bgcolor=#fefefe
| 281177 ||  || — || March 10, 2007 || Palomar || NEAT || NYS || align=right data-sort-value="0.78" | 780 m || 
|-id=178 bgcolor=#fefefe
| 281178 ||  || — || March 10, 2007 || Kitt Peak || Spacewatch || — || align=right data-sort-value="0.80" | 800 m || 
|-id=179 bgcolor=#fefefe
| 281179 ||  || — || March 10, 2007 || Palomar || NEAT || V || align=right | 1.00 km || 
|-id=180 bgcolor=#fefefe
| 281180 ||  || — || March 12, 2007 || Kitt Peak || Spacewatch || — || align=right data-sort-value="0.82" | 820 m || 
|-id=181 bgcolor=#fefefe
| 281181 ||  || — || March 10, 2007 || Palomar || NEAT || — || align=right | 2.0 km || 
|-id=182 bgcolor=#fefefe
| 281182 ||  || — || March 11, 2007 || Mount Lemmon || Mount Lemmon Survey || — || align=right | 1.0 km || 
|-id=183 bgcolor=#fefefe
| 281183 ||  || — || March 12, 2007 || Mount Lemmon || Mount Lemmon Survey || — || align=right data-sort-value="0.84" | 840 m || 
|-id=184 bgcolor=#fefefe
| 281184 ||  || — || March 12, 2007 || Mount Lemmon || Mount Lemmon Survey || NYS || align=right data-sort-value="0.89" | 890 m || 
|-id=185 bgcolor=#fefefe
| 281185 ||  || — || March 12, 2007 || Mount Lemmon || Mount Lemmon Survey || NYS || align=right data-sort-value="0.69" | 690 m || 
|-id=186 bgcolor=#E9E9E9
| 281186 ||  || — || March 11, 2007 || Catalina || CSS || — || align=right | 2.5 km || 
|-id=187 bgcolor=#fefefe
| 281187 ||  || — || March 14, 2007 || Kitt Peak || Spacewatch || — || align=right data-sort-value="0.82" | 820 m || 
|-id=188 bgcolor=#fefefe
| 281188 ||  || — || March 14, 2007 || Kitt Peak || Spacewatch || — || align=right | 1.2 km || 
|-id=189 bgcolor=#E9E9E9
| 281189 ||  || — || March 14, 2007 || Kitt Peak || Spacewatch || GEF || align=right | 1.4 km || 
|-id=190 bgcolor=#fefefe
| 281190 ||  || — || March 14, 2007 || Kitt Peak || Spacewatch || NYS || align=right data-sort-value="0.76" | 760 m || 
|-id=191 bgcolor=#fefefe
| 281191 ||  || — || March 15, 2007 || Catalina || CSS || — || align=right data-sort-value="0.86" | 860 m || 
|-id=192 bgcolor=#fefefe
| 281192 ||  || — || March 8, 2007 || Palomar || NEAT || — || align=right | 1.0 km || 
|-id=193 bgcolor=#fefefe
| 281193 ||  || — || March 9, 2007 || Mount Lemmon || Mount Lemmon Survey || MAS || align=right data-sort-value="0.82" | 820 m || 
|-id=194 bgcolor=#fefefe
| 281194 ||  || — || March 9, 2007 || Kitt Peak || Spacewatch || NYS || align=right data-sort-value="0.79" | 790 m || 
|-id=195 bgcolor=#fefefe
| 281195 ||  || — || March 9, 2007 || Kitt Peak || Spacewatch || — || align=right | 1.1 km || 
|-id=196 bgcolor=#fefefe
| 281196 ||  || — || March 13, 2007 || Kitt Peak || Spacewatch || NYS || align=right data-sort-value="0.78" | 780 m || 
|-id=197 bgcolor=#fefefe
| 281197 ||  || — || March 13, 2007 || Kitt Peak || Spacewatch || V || align=right data-sort-value="0.83" | 830 m || 
|-id=198 bgcolor=#fefefe
| 281198 ||  || — || March 11, 2007 || Kitt Peak || Spacewatch || NYS || align=right data-sort-value="0.95" | 950 m || 
|-id=199 bgcolor=#fefefe
| 281199 ||  || — || March 16, 2007 || Kitt Peak || Spacewatch || NYS || align=right data-sort-value="0.77" | 770 m || 
|-id=200 bgcolor=#fefefe
| 281200 ||  || — || March 20, 2007 || Kitt Peak || Spacewatch || MAS || align=right data-sort-value="0.98" | 980 m || 
|}

281201–281300 

|-bgcolor=#fefefe
| 281201 ||  || — || March 16, 2007 || Mount Lemmon || Mount Lemmon Survey || — || align=right data-sort-value="0.75" | 750 m || 
|-id=202 bgcolor=#fefefe
| 281202 ||  || — || March 20, 2007 || Mount Lemmon || Mount Lemmon Survey || NYS || align=right data-sort-value="0.73" | 730 m || 
|-id=203 bgcolor=#fefefe
| 281203 ||  || — || April 11, 2007 || Mount Lemmon || Mount Lemmon Survey || — || align=right data-sort-value="0.80" | 800 m || 
|-id=204 bgcolor=#fefefe
| 281204 ||  || — || April 14, 2007 || Mount Lemmon || Mount Lemmon Survey || MAS || align=right | 1.2 km || 
|-id=205 bgcolor=#fefefe
| 281205 ||  || — || April 14, 2007 || Kitt Peak || Spacewatch || — || align=right | 1.0 km || 
|-id=206 bgcolor=#fefefe
| 281206 ||  || — || April 15, 2007 || Socorro || LINEAR || PHO || align=right | 1.2 km || 
|-id=207 bgcolor=#fefefe
| 281207 ||  || — || April 15, 2007 || Socorro || LINEAR || H || align=right data-sort-value="0.91" | 910 m || 
|-id=208 bgcolor=#fefefe
| 281208 ||  || — || April 15, 2007 || Moletai || Molėtai Obs. || V || align=right data-sort-value="0.94" | 940 m || 
|-id=209 bgcolor=#fefefe
| 281209 ||  || — || April 15, 2007 || Kitt Peak || Spacewatch || — || align=right | 2.5 km || 
|-id=210 bgcolor=#E9E9E9
| 281210 ||  || — || April 15, 2007 || Kitt Peak || Spacewatch || — || align=right | 2.3 km || 
|-id=211 bgcolor=#E9E9E9
| 281211 ||  || — || April 16, 2007 || Catalina || CSS || — || align=right | 2.1 km || 
|-id=212 bgcolor=#E9E9E9
| 281212 ||  || — || April 16, 2007 || Catalina || CSS || DOR || align=right | 3.8 km || 
|-id=213 bgcolor=#fefefe
| 281213 ||  || — || April 17, 2007 || 7300 || W. K. Y. Yeung || — || align=right | 2.7 km || 
|-id=214 bgcolor=#fefefe
| 281214 ||  || — || April 18, 2007 || Mount Lemmon || Mount Lemmon Survey || MAS || align=right data-sort-value="0.86" | 860 m || 
|-id=215 bgcolor=#fefefe
| 281215 ||  || — || April 18, 2007 || Anderson Mesa || LONEOS || V || align=right | 1.0 km || 
|-id=216 bgcolor=#fefefe
| 281216 ||  || — || April 18, 2007 || Kitt Peak || Spacewatch || NYS || align=right data-sort-value="0.93" | 930 m || 
|-id=217 bgcolor=#E9E9E9
| 281217 ||  || — || April 19, 2007 || Mount Lemmon || Mount Lemmon Survey || — || align=right | 1.8 km || 
|-id=218 bgcolor=#fefefe
| 281218 ||  || — || April 19, 2007 || Mount Lemmon || Mount Lemmon Survey || NYS || align=right data-sort-value="0.72" | 720 m || 
|-id=219 bgcolor=#E9E9E9
| 281219 ||  || — || April 14, 2007 || Kitt Peak || Spacewatch || EUN || align=right | 1.9 km || 
|-id=220 bgcolor=#fefefe
| 281220 ||  || — || April 20, 2007 || Socorro || LINEAR || MAS || align=right | 1.0 km || 
|-id=221 bgcolor=#fefefe
| 281221 ||  || — || April 22, 2007 || Kitt Peak || Spacewatch || NYS || align=right data-sort-value="0.75" | 750 m || 
|-id=222 bgcolor=#fefefe
| 281222 ||  || — || April 23, 2007 || Catalina || CSS || V || align=right | 1.1 km || 
|-id=223 bgcolor=#fefefe
| 281223 ||  || — || April 22, 2007 || Mount Lemmon || Mount Lemmon Survey || V || align=right | 1.1 km || 
|-id=224 bgcolor=#fefefe
| 281224 ||  || — || April 22, 2007 || Kitt Peak || Spacewatch || — || align=right data-sort-value="0.85" | 850 m || 
|-id=225 bgcolor=#E9E9E9
| 281225 ||  || — || December 7, 2005 || Kitt Peak || Spacewatch || — || align=right data-sort-value="0.97" | 970 m || 
|-id=226 bgcolor=#fefefe
| 281226 ||  || — || April 23, 2007 || Kitt Peak || Spacewatch || — || align=right | 2.4 km || 
|-id=227 bgcolor=#E9E9E9
| 281227 ||  || — || April 18, 2007 || Mount Lemmon || Mount Lemmon Survey || — || align=right data-sort-value="0.94" | 940 m || 
|-id=228 bgcolor=#E9E9E9
| 281228 ||  || — || April 18, 2007 || Kitt Peak || Spacewatch || HOF || align=right | 4.1 km || 
|-id=229 bgcolor=#fefefe
| 281229 ||  || — || May 7, 2007 || Kitt Peak || Spacewatch || — || align=right | 1.1 km || 
|-id=230 bgcolor=#E9E9E9
| 281230 ||  || — || May 6, 2007 || Kitt Peak || Spacewatch || — || align=right | 2.8 km || 
|-id=231 bgcolor=#E9E9E9
| 281231 ||  || — || May 9, 2007 || Mount Lemmon || Mount Lemmon Survey || — || align=right data-sort-value="0.97" | 970 m || 
|-id=232 bgcolor=#E9E9E9
| 281232 ||  || — || May 9, 2007 || Mount Lemmon || Mount Lemmon Survey || — || align=right | 1.1 km || 
|-id=233 bgcolor=#fefefe
| 281233 ||  || — || May 12, 2007 || Mount Lemmon || Mount Lemmon Survey || — || align=right | 1.7 km || 
|-id=234 bgcolor=#fefefe
| 281234 ||  || — || May 9, 2007 || Mount Lemmon || Mount Lemmon Survey || — || align=right | 1.2 km || 
|-id=235 bgcolor=#E9E9E9
| 281235 ||  || — || May 15, 2007 || Wrightwood || J. W. Young || HNS || align=right | 1.7 km || 
|-id=236 bgcolor=#fefefe
| 281236 ||  || — || May 15, 2007 || Kitt Peak || Spacewatch || — || align=right data-sort-value="0.85" | 850 m || 
|-id=237 bgcolor=#E9E9E9
| 281237 ||  || — || May 15, 2007 || La Sagra || OAM Obs. || BRU || align=right | 4.2 km || 
|-id=238 bgcolor=#E9E9E9
| 281238 || 2007 KQ || — || May 16, 2007 || Eskridge || G. Hug || — || align=right | 1.3 km || 
|-id=239 bgcolor=#E9E9E9
| 281239 ||  || — || May 24, 2007 || Mount Lemmon || Mount Lemmon Survey || — || align=right | 1.1 km || 
|-id=240 bgcolor=#E9E9E9
| 281240 ||  || — || June 8, 2007 || Kitt Peak || Spacewatch || — || align=right | 1.1 km || 
|-id=241 bgcolor=#d6d6d6
| 281241 ||  || — || June 9, 2007 || Kitt Peak || Spacewatch || — || align=right | 3.9 km || 
|-id=242 bgcolor=#E9E9E9
| 281242 ||  || — || June 9, 2007 || Kitt Peak || Spacewatch || — || align=right | 1.3 km || 
|-id=243 bgcolor=#E9E9E9
| 281243 ||  || — || June 12, 2007 || Kitt Peak || Spacewatch || — || align=right | 1.2 km || 
|-id=244 bgcolor=#E9E9E9
| 281244 ||  || — || June 14, 2007 || Kitt Peak || Spacewatch || — || align=right | 2.4 km || 
|-id=245 bgcolor=#E9E9E9
| 281245 ||  || — || June 16, 2007 || Kitt Peak || Spacewatch || VIB || align=right | 1.9 km || 
|-id=246 bgcolor=#E9E9E9
| 281246 ||  || — || June 18, 2007 || Catalina || CSS || — || align=right | 3.0 km || 
|-id=247 bgcolor=#E9E9E9
| 281247 ||  || — || June 19, 2007 || Piszkéstető || K. Sárneczky || — || align=right | 1.9 km || 
|-id=248 bgcolor=#E9E9E9
| 281248 ||  || — || June 20, 2007 || Kitt Peak || Spacewatch || — || align=right | 2.9 km || 
|-id=249 bgcolor=#E9E9E9
| 281249 ||  || — || June 22, 2007 || Anderson Mesa || LONEOS || — || align=right | 2.8 km || 
|-id=250 bgcolor=#E9E9E9
| 281250 ||  || — || June 20, 2007 || Siding Spring || SSS || — || align=right | 2.2 km || 
|-id=251 bgcolor=#E9E9E9
| 281251 ||  || — || July 9, 2007 || Eskridge || G. Hug || — || align=right | 2.4 km || 
|-id=252 bgcolor=#E9E9E9
| 281252 ||  || — || July 10, 2007 || Siding Spring || SSS || EUN || align=right | 2.1 km || 
|-id=253 bgcolor=#E9E9E9
| 281253 ||  || — || July 20, 2007 || La Sagra || OAM Obs. || — || align=right | 1.9 km || 
|-id=254 bgcolor=#E9E9E9
| 281254 ||  || — || August 4, 2007 || Reedy Creek || J. Broughton || — || align=right | 1.7 km || 
|-id=255 bgcolor=#E9E9E9
| 281255 ||  || — || August 8, 2007 || Siding Spring || SSS || — || align=right | 2.3 km || 
|-id=256 bgcolor=#E9E9E9
| 281256 ||  || — || August 9, 2007 || Socorro || LINEAR || — || align=right | 2.3 km || 
|-id=257 bgcolor=#E9E9E9
| 281257 ||  || — || August 9, 2007 || Socorro || LINEAR || — || align=right | 2.6 km || 
|-id=258 bgcolor=#E9E9E9
| 281258 ||  || — || August 9, 2007 || Socorro || LINEAR || — || align=right | 3.8 km || 
|-id=259 bgcolor=#E9E9E9
| 281259 ||  || — || August 9, 2007 || Socorro || LINEAR || — || align=right | 2.7 km || 
|-id=260 bgcolor=#d6d6d6
| 281260 ||  || — || August 11, 2007 || Socorro || LINEAR || EOS || align=right | 3.1 km || 
|-id=261 bgcolor=#d6d6d6
| 281261 ||  || — || August 11, 2007 || Socorro || LINEAR || IMH || align=right | 3.9 km || 
|-id=262 bgcolor=#E9E9E9
| 281262 ||  || — || August 13, 2007 || Socorro || LINEAR || — || align=right | 2.6 km || 
|-id=263 bgcolor=#fefefe
| 281263 ||  || — || August 13, 2007 || Socorro || LINEAR || — || align=right | 1.1 km || 
|-id=264 bgcolor=#E9E9E9
| 281264 ||  || — || August 13, 2007 || Socorro || LINEAR || AEO || align=right | 1.6 km || 
|-id=265 bgcolor=#E9E9E9
| 281265 ||  || — || August 16, 2007 || Purple Mountain || PMO NEO || DOR || align=right | 4.1 km || 
|-id=266 bgcolor=#d6d6d6
| 281266 ||  || — || August 20, 2007 || Pla D'Arguines || R. Ferrando || — || align=right | 2.8 km || 
|-id=267 bgcolor=#d6d6d6
| 281267 ||  || — || August 19, 2007 || La Sagra || OAM Obs. || — || align=right | 3.9 km || 
|-id=268 bgcolor=#E9E9E9
| 281268 ||  || — || August 21, 2007 || Siding Spring || SSS || — || align=right | 2.2 km || 
|-id=269 bgcolor=#d6d6d6
| 281269 ||  || — || August 23, 2007 || Kitt Peak || Spacewatch || EOS || align=right | 4.5 km || 
|-id=270 bgcolor=#E9E9E9
| 281270 ||  || — || September 2, 2007 || Siding Spring || K. Sárneczky, L. Kiss || — || align=right | 3.2 km || 
|-id=271 bgcolor=#E9E9E9
| 281271 ||  || — || September 5, 2007 || Dauban || Chante-Perdrix Obs. || CLO || align=right | 2.4 km || 
|-id=272 bgcolor=#E9E9E9
| 281272 Arnaudleroy ||  ||  || September 10, 2007 || Pic du Midi || Pic du Midi Obs. || — || align=right | 2.5 km || 
|-id=273 bgcolor=#E9E9E9
| 281273 ||  || — || September 4, 2007 || Mount Lemmon || Mount Lemmon Survey || JUN || align=right | 1.3 km || 
|-id=274 bgcolor=#E9E9E9
| 281274 ||  || — || September 4, 2007 || Mount Lemmon || Mount Lemmon Survey || — || align=right | 2.5 km || 
|-id=275 bgcolor=#E9E9E9
| 281275 ||  || — || September 5, 2007 || Catalina || CSS || — || align=right | 4.7 km || 
|-id=276 bgcolor=#d6d6d6
| 281276 ||  || — || September 8, 2007 || Anderson Mesa || LONEOS || — || align=right | 3.1 km || 
|-id=277 bgcolor=#d6d6d6
| 281277 ||  || — || September 9, 2007 || Kitt Peak || Spacewatch || — || align=right | 4.1 km || 
|-id=278 bgcolor=#d6d6d6
| 281278 ||  || — || September 9, 2007 || Kitt Peak || Spacewatch || — || align=right | 4.1 km || 
|-id=279 bgcolor=#d6d6d6
| 281279 ||  || — || September 10, 2007 || Mount Lemmon || Mount Lemmon Survey || VER || align=right | 2.7 km || 
|-id=280 bgcolor=#d6d6d6
| 281280 ||  || — || September 10, 2007 || Mount Lemmon || Mount Lemmon Survey || — || align=right | 2.9 km || 
|-id=281 bgcolor=#d6d6d6
| 281281 ||  || — || September 10, 2007 || Mount Lemmon || Mount Lemmon Survey || — || align=right | 2.7 km || 
|-id=282 bgcolor=#d6d6d6
| 281282 ||  || — || September 10, 2007 || Kitt Peak || Spacewatch || — || align=right | 4.4 km || 
|-id=283 bgcolor=#d6d6d6
| 281283 ||  || — || September 11, 2007 || Catalina || CSS || — || align=right | 4.6 km || 
|-id=284 bgcolor=#d6d6d6
| 281284 ||  || — || September 11, 2007 || Kitt Peak || Spacewatch || — || align=right | 3.7 km || 
|-id=285 bgcolor=#d6d6d6
| 281285 ||  || — || September 11, 2007 || Mount Lemmon || Mount Lemmon Survey || — || align=right | 4.7 km || 
|-id=286 bgcolor=#d6d6d6
| 281286 ||  || — || September 12, 2007 || Mount Lemmon || Mount Lemmon Survey || THM || align=right | 2.7 km || 
|-id=287 bgcolor=#E9E9E9
| 281287 ||  || — || September 15, 2007 || Vicques || M. Ory || — || align=right | 2.2 km || 
|-id=288 bgcolor=#d6d6d6
| 281288 ||  || — || September 14, 2007 || Mount Lemmon || Mount Lemmon Survey || — || align=right | 3.3 km || 
|-id=289 bgcolor=#d6d6d6
| 281289 ||  || — || March 9, 2005 || Kitt Peak || Spacewatch || URS || align=right | 3.8 km || 
|-id=290 bgcolor=#fefefe
| 281290 ||  || — || September 14, 2007 || Socorro || LINEAR || — || align=right | 1.0 km || 
|-id=291 bgcolor=#d6d6d6
| 281291 ||  || — || September 12, 2007 || Catalina || CSS || — || align=right | 4.0 km || 
|-id=292 bgcolor=#d6d6d6
| 281292 ||  || — || September 12, 2007 || Catalina || CSS || — || align=right | 3.7 km || 
|-id=293 bgcolor=#d6d6d6
| 281293 ||  || — || September 10, 2007 || Kitt Peak || Spacewatch || — || align=right | 3.4 km || 
|-id=294 bgcolor=#d6d6d6
| 281294 ||  || — || September 10, 2007 || Kitt Peak || Spacewatch || — || align=right | 3.0 km || 
|-id=295 bgcolor=#d6d6d6
| 281295 ||  || — || September 13, 2007 || Kitt Peak || Spacewatch || — || align=right | 3.3 km || 
|-id=296 bgcolor=#E9E9E9
| 281296 ||  || — || September 13, 2007 || Anderson Mesa || LONEOS || — || align=right | 2.4 km || 
|-id=297 bgcolor=#d6d6d6
| 281297 ||  || — || September 14, 2007 || Catalina || CSS || EOS || align=right | 2.8 km || 
|-id=298 bgcolor=#d6d6d6
| 281298 ||  || — || September 14, 2007 || Catalina || CSS || EOS || align=right | 2.6 km || 
|-id=299 bgcolor=#d6d6d6
| 281299 ||  || — || September 14, 2007 || Mount Lemmon || Mount Lemmon Survey || — || align=right | 3.2 km || 
|-id=300 bgcolor=#d6d6d6
| 281300 ||  || — || September 12, 2007 || Catalina || CSS || EOS || align=right | 3.2 km || 
|}

281301–281400 

|-bgcolor=#d6d6d6
| 281301 ||  || — || September 12, 2007 || Mount Lemmon || Mount Lemmon Survey || — || align=right | 5.3 km || 
|-id=302 bgcolor=#d6d6d6
| 281302 ||  || — || September 12, 2007 || Catalina || CSS || EOS || align=right | 2.5 km || 
|-id=303 bgcolor=#d6d6d6
| 281303 ||  || — || September 11, 2007 || Lulin || LUSS || — || align=right | 2.6 km || 
|-id=304 bgcolor=#d6d6d6
| 281304 ||  || — || September 12, 2007 || Catalina || CSS || — || align=right | 4.7 km || 
|-id=305 bgcolor=#d6d6d6
| 281305 ||  || — || September 13, 2007 || Mount Lemmon || Mount Lemmon Survey || — || align=right | 3.0 km || 
|-id=306 bgcolor=#d6d6d6
| 281306 ||  || — || September 19, 2007 || Socorro || LINEAR || — || align=right | 3.7 km || 
|-id=307 bgcolor=#d6d6d6
| 281307 ||  || — || September 18, 2007 || Kitt Peak || Spacewatch || — || align=right | 3.7 km || 
|-id=308 bgcolor=#d6d6d6
| 281308 ||  || — || September 23, 2007 || Antares || ARO || EOS || align=right | 2.1 km || 
|-id=309 bgcolor=#d6d6d6
| 281309 ||  || — || October 5, 2007 || Prairie Grass || J. Mahony || — || align=right | 2.9 km || 
|-id=310 bgcolor=#d6d6d6
| 281310 ||  || — || October 7, 2007 || Socorro || LINEAR || — || align=right | 4.0 km || 
|-id=311 bgcolor=#d6d6d6
| 281311 ||  || — || October 6, 2007 || Kitt Peak || Spacewatch || THM || align=right | 3.1 km || 
|-id=312 bgcolor=#d6d6d6
| 281312 ||  || — || October 4, 2007 || Kitt Peak || Spacewatch || — || align=right | 3.0 km || 
|-id=313 bgcolor=#d6d6d6
| 281313 ||  || — || October 6, 2007 || Kitt Peak || Spacewatch || HYG || align=right | 3.3 km || 
|-id=314 bgcolor=#d6d6d6
| 281314 ||  || — || October 7, 2007 || Mount Lemmon || Mount Lemmon Survey || — || align=right | 3.9 km || 
|-id=315 bgcolor=#d6d6d6
| 281315 ||  || — || October 5, 2007 || Kitt Peak || Spacewatch || — || align=right | 3.7 km || 
|-id=316 bgcolor=#d6d6d6
| 281316 ||  || — || October 5, 2007 || Kitt Peak || Spacewatch || — || align=right | 2.9 km || 
|-id=317 bgcolor=#d6d6d6
| 281317 ||  || — || October 8, 2007 || Mount Lemmon || Mount Lemmon Survey || — || align=right | 3.5 km || 
|-id=318 bgcolor=#d6d6d6
| 281318 ||  || — || October 8, 2007 || Mount Lemmon || Mount Lemmon Survey || 7:4 || align=right | 4.5 km || 
|-id=319 bgcolor=#d6d6d6
| 281319 ||  || — || October 6, 2007 || Socorro || LINEAR || VER || align=right | 4.7 km || 
|-id=320 bgcolor=#d6d6d6
| 281320 ||  || — || October 6, 2007 || Socorro || LINEAR || — || align=right | 3.2 km || 
|-id=321 bgcolor=#fefefe
| 281321 ||  || — || October 8, 2007 || Anderson Mesa || LONEOS || CHL || align=right | 2.3 km || 
|-id=322 bgcolor=#d6d6d6
| 281322 ||  || — || October 9, 2007 || Purple Mountain || PMO NEO || LIX || align=right | 6.1 km || 
|-id=323 bgcolor=#d6d6d6
| 281323 ||  || — || October 9, 2007 || Purple Mountain || PMO NEO || — || align=right | 4.3 km || 
|-id=324 bgcolor=#d6d6d6
| 281324 ||  || — || October 10, 2007 || Mount Lemmon || Mount Lemmon Survey || — || align=right | 3.7 km || 
|-id=325 bgcolor=#d6d6d6
| 281325 ||  || — || October 13, 2007 || Socorro || LINEAR || — || align=right | 5.3 km || 
|-id=326 bgcolor=#d6d6d6
| 281326 ||  || — || October 4, 2007 || Catalina || CSS || EOS || align=right | 2.6 km || 
|-id=327 bgcolor=#d6d6d6
| 281327 ||  || — || October 8, 2007 || Kitt Peak || Spacewatch || — || align=right | 2.9 km || 
|-id=328 bgcolor=#d6d6d6
| 281328 ||  || — || October 7, 2007 || Catalina || CSS || HYG || align=right | 3.9 km || 
|-id=329 bgcolor=#d6d6d6
| 281329 ||  || — || October 8, 2007 || Catalina || CSS || — || align=right | 4.2 km || 
|-id=330 bgcolor=#E9E9E9
| 281330 ||  || — || October 8, 2007 || Catalina || CSS || — || align=right | 3.6 km || 
|-id=331 bgcolor=#d6d6d6
| 281331 ||  || — || October 9, 2007 || Mount Lemmon || Mount Lemmon Survey || THM || align=right | 2.8 km || 
|-id=332 bgcolor=#d6d6d6
| 281332 ||  || — || October 11, 2007 || Mount Lemmon || Mount Lemmon Survey || — || align=right | 2.8 km || 
|-id=333 bgcolor=#d6d6d6
| 281333 ||  || — || October 11, 2007 || Kitt Peak || Spacewatch || — || align=right | 4.0 km || 
|-id=334 bgcolor=#d6d6d6
| 281334 ||  || — || October 12, 2007 || Kitt Peak || Spacewatch || — || align=right | 2.7 km || 
|-id=335 bgcolor=#d6d6d6
| 281335 ||  || — || October 9, 2007 || Mount Lemmon || Mount Lemmon Survey || — || align=right | 3.2 km || 
|-id=336 bgcolor=#d6d6d6
| 281336 ||  || — || October 14, 2007 || Mount Lemmon || Mount Lemmon Survey || — || align=right | 3.3 km || 
|-id=337 bgcolor=#d6d6d6
| 281337 ||  || — || October 15, 2007 || Catalina || CSS || — || align=right | 3.1 km || 
|-id=338 bgcolor=#d6d6d6
| 281338 ||  || — || October 12, 2007 || Kitt Peak || Spacewatch || HYG || align=right | 3.0 km || 
|-id=339 bgcolor=#d6d6d6
| 281339 ||  || — || October 14, 2007 || Catalina || CSS || — || align=right | 4.9 km || 
|-id=340 bgcolor=#d6d6d6
| 281340 ||  || — || October 4, 2007 || Catalina || CSS || — || align=right | 4.3 km || 
|-id=341 bgcolor=#d6d6d6
| 281341 ||  || — || October 9, 2007 || Anderson Mesa || LONEOS || — || align=right | 2.8 km || 
|-id=342 bgcolor=#d6d6d6
| 281342 ||  || — || October 18, 2007 || 7300 || W. K. Y. Yeung || — || align=right | 3.5 km || 
|-id=343 bgcolor=#d6d6d6
| 281343 ||  || — || October 16, 2007 || Kitt Peak || Spacewatch || HYG || align=right | 4.1 km || 
|-id=344 bgcolor=#d6d6d6
| 281344 ||  || — || October 19, 2007 || Mount Lemmon || Mount Lemmon Survey || — || align=right | 5.6 km || 
|-id=345 bgcolor=#E9E9E9
| 281345 ||  || — || October 16, 2007 || Catalina || CSS || MAR || align=right | 1.6 km || 
|-id=346 bgcolor=#d6d6d6
| 281346 ||  || — || October 18, 2007 || Mount Lemmon || Mount Lemmon Survey || — || align=right | 3.7 km || 
|-id=347 bgcolor=#E9E9E9
| 281347 ||  || — || October 31, 2007 || Kitt Peak || Spacewatch || EUN || align=right | 1.5 km || 
|-id=348 bgcolor=#d6d6d6
| 281348 ||  || — || October 20, 2007 || Siding Spring || K. Sárneczky, L. Kiss || — || align=right | 2.7 km || 
|-id=349 bgcolor=#d6d6d6
| 281349 ||  || — || October 20, 2007 || Catalina || CSS || — || align=right | 3.6 km || 
|-id=350 bgcolor=#fefefe
| 281350 ||  || — || October 16, 2007 || Mount Lemmon || Mount Lemmon Survey || — || align=right data-sort-value="0.87" | 870 m || 
|-id=351 bgcolor=#E9E9E9
| 281351 ||  || — || November 5, 2007 || La Sagra || OAM Obs. || CLO || align=right | 3.3 km || 
|-id=352 bgcolor=#d6d6d6
| 281352 ||  || — || November 2, 2007 || Kitt Peak || Spacewatch || — || align=right | 4.1 km || 
|-id=353 bgcolor=#d6d6d6
| 281353 ||  || — || November 2, 2007 || Mount Lemmon || Mount Lemmon Survey || HYG || align=right | 3.3 km || 
|-id=354 bgcolor=#d6d6d6
| 281354 ||  || — || November 1, 2007 || Kitt Peak || Spacewatch || AEG || align=right | 4.0 km || 
|-id=355 bgcolor=#E9E9E9
| 281355 ||  || — || November 4, 2007 || Kitt Peak || Spacewatch || — || align=right | 3.3 km || 
|-id=356 bgcolor=#d6d6d6
| 281356 ||  || — || November 5, 2007 || Mount Lemmon || Mount Lemmon Survey || — || align=right | 4.7 km || 
|-id=357 bgcolor=#d6d6d6
| 281357 ||  || — || November 4, 2007 || Mount Lemmon || Mount Lemmon Survey || — || align=right | 6.8 km || 
|-id=358 bgcolor=#d6d6d6
| 281358 ||  || — || November 15, 2007 || Catalina || CSS || LIX || align=right | 4.2 km || 
|-id=359 bgcolor=#E9E9E9
| 281359 ||  || — || November 15, 2007 || Catalina || CSS || — || align=right | 2.6 km || 
|-id=360 bgcolor=#d6d6d6
| 281360 ||  || — || November 12, 2007 || Catalina || CSS || — || align=right | 6.1 km || 
|-id=361 bgcolor=#d6d6d6
| 281361 ||  || — || November 18, 2007 || Mount Lemmon || Mount Lemmon Survey || EUP || align=right | 4.3 km || 
|-id=362 bgcolor=#d6d6d6
| 281362 ||  || — || December 28, 2007 || Kitt Peak || Spacewatch || — || align=right | 3.5 km || 
|-id=363 bgcolor=#fefefe
| 281363 ||  || — || February 6, 2008 || Socorro || LINEAR || H || align=right data-sort-value="0.94" | 940 m || 
|-id=364 bgcolor=#d6d6d6
| 281364 ||  || — || February 2, 2008 || Mount Lemmon || Mount Lemmon Survey || — || align=right | 4.1 km || 
|-id=365 bgcolor=#FFC2E0
| 281365 ||  || — || February 10, 2008 || Mount Lemmon || Mount Lemmon Survey || APO +1km || align=right | 1.1 km || 
|-id=366 bgcolor=#fefefe
| 281366 ||  || — || February 1, 2008 || Catalina || CSS || H || align=right | 1.0 km || 
|-id=367 bgcolor=#d6d6d6
| 281367 ||  || — || February 1, 2008 || Mount Lemmon || Mount Lemmon Survey || ALA || align=right | 4.9 km || 
|-id=368 bgcolor=#fefefe
| 281368 ||  || — || March 2, 2008 || Catalina || CSS || H || align=right data-sort-value="0.87" | 870 m || 
|-id=369 bgcolor=#fefefe
| 281369 ||  || — || March 3, 2008 || Purple Mountain || PMO NEO || — || align=right data-sort-value="0.99" | 990 m || 
|-id=370 bgcolor=#fefefe
| 281370 ||  || — || March 28, 2008 || Mount Lemmon || Mount Lemmon Survey || H || align=right data-sort-value="0.59" | 590 m || 
|-id=371 bgcolor=#C7FF8F
| 281371 ||  || — || March 31, 2008 || Mount Lemmon || Mount Lemmon Survey || centaur || align=right | 58 km || 
|-id=372 bgcolor=#fefefe
| 281372 ||  || — || April 4, 2008 || Catalina || CSS || H || align=right data-sort-value="0.72" | 720 m || 
|-id=373 bgcolor=#d6d6d6
| 281373 ||  || — || April 5, 2008 || Mount Lemmon || Mount Lemmon Survey || — || align=right | 3.8 km || 
|-id=374 bgcolor=#fefefe
| 281374 ||  || — || May 1, 2008 || Kitt Peak || Spacewatch || V || align=right data-sort-value="0.90" | 900 m || 
|-id=375 bgcolor=#FFC2E0
| 281375 ||  || — || May 8, 2008 || Catalina || CSS || ATEPHA || align=right data-sort-value="0.26" | 260 m || 
|-id=376 bgcolor=#fefefe
| 281376 ||  || — || May 15, 2008 || Mount Lemmon || Mount Lemmon Survey || — || align=right data-sort-value="0.64" | 640 m || 
|-id=377 bgcolor=#fefefe
| 281377 ||  || — || July 25, 2008 || Siding Spring || SSS || FLO || align=right data-sort-value="0.80" | 800 m || 
|-id=378 bgcolor=#fefefe
| 281378 ||  || — || July 29, 2008 || La Sagra || OAM Obs. || — || align=right data-sort-value="0.71" | 710 m || 
|-id=379 bgcolor=#fefefe
| 281379 ||  || — || July 30, 2008 || Dauban || F. Kugel || — || align=right data-sort-value="0.85" | 850 m || 
|-id=380 bgcolor=#fefefe
| 281380 ||  || — || July 28, 2008 || Dauban || F. Kugel || FLO || align=right data-sort-value="0.86" | 860 m || 
|-id=381 bgcolor=#fefefe
| 281381 ||  || — || July 31, 2008 || Dauban || F. Kugel || — || align=right data-sort-value="0.85" | 850 m || 
|-id=382 bgcolor=#E9E9E9
| 281382 ||  || — || July 29, 2008 || Socorro || LINEAR || — || align=right | 4.7 km || 
|-id=383 bgcolor=#fefefe
| 281383 ||  || — || July 25, 2008 || Siding Spring || SSS || FLO || align=right data-sort-value="0.80" | 800 m || 
|-id=384 bgcolor=#fefefe
| 281384 ||  || — || August 4, 2008 || La Sagra || OAM Obs. || — || align=right data-sort-value="0.92" | 920 m || 
|-id=385 bgcolor=#fefefe
| 281385 ||  || — || August 6, 2008 || La Sagra || OAM Obs. || FLO || align=right data-sort-value="0.65" | 650 m || 
|-id=386 bgcolor=#fefefe
| 281386 ||  || — || August 7, 2008 || Hibiscus || S. F. Hönig, N. Teamo || — || align=right data-sort-value="0.98" | 980 m || 
|-id=387 bgcolor=#E9E9E9
| 281387 ||  || — || August 5, 2008 || Siding Spring || SSS || — || align=right | 3.9 km || 
|-id=388 bgcolor=#fefefe
| 281388 ||  || — || August 24, 2008 || La Sagra || OAM Obs. || — || align=right | 1.0 km || 
|-id=389 bgcolor=#fefefe
| 281389 ||  || — || August 25, 2008 || Reedy Creek || J. Broughton || — || align=right data-sort-value="0.90" | 900 m || 
|-id=390 bgcolor=#fefefe
| 281390 ||  || — || August 25, 2008 || La Sagra || OAM Obs. || NYS || align=right data-sort-value="0.60" | 600 m || 
|-id=391 bgcolor=#E9E9E9
| 281391 ||  || — || October 4, 1996 || Kitt Peak || Spacewatch || MAR || align=right | 1.3 km || 
|-id=392 bgcolor=#fefefe
| 281392 ||  || — || August 30, 2008 || La Sagra || OAM Obs. || — || align=right | 1.2 km || 
|-id=393 bgcolor=#fefefe
| 281393 ||  || — || August 30, 2008 || Socorro || LINEAR || — || align=right | 1.1 km || 
|-id=394 bgcolor=#fefefe
| 281394 ||  || — || August 21, 2008 || Kitt Peak || Spacewatch || — || align=right data-sort-value="0.79" | 790 m || 
|-id=395 bgcolor=#fefefe
| 281395 ||  || — || August 30, 2008 || Socorro || LINEAR || — || align=right | 1.1 km || 
|-id=396 bgcolor=#FA8072
| 281396 ||  || — || August 25, 2008 || Socorro || LINEAR || — || align=right | 1.3 km || 
|-id=397 bgcolor=#fefefe
| 281397 ||  || — || September 3, 2008 || La Sagra || OAM Obs. || MAS || align=right data-sort-value="0.96" | 960 m || 
|-id=398 bgcolor=#fefefe
| 281398 ||  || — || September 5, 2008 || Junk Bond || D. Healy || — || align=right data-sort-value="0.87" | 870 m || 
|-id=399 bgcolor=#fefefe
| 281399 ||  || — || September 2, 2008 || Kitt Peak || Spacewatch || — || align=right | 1.1 km || 
|-id=400 bgcolor=#fefefe
| 281400 ||  || — || September 2, 2008 || Kitt Peak || Spacewatch || NYS || align=right data-sort-value="0.86" | 860 m || 
|}

281401–281500 

|-bgcolor=#fefefe
| 281401 ||  || — || September 2, 2008 || Kitt Peak || Spacewatch || MAS || align=right data-sort-value="0.84" | 840 m || 
|-id=402 bgcolor=#fefefe
| 281402 ||  || — || September 2, 2008 || Kitt Peak || Spacewatch || NYS || align=right data-sort-value="0.78" | 780 m || 
|-id=403 bgcolor=#E9E9E9
| 281403 ||  || — || September 2, 2008 || Kitt Peak || Spacewatch || NEM || align=right | 2.6 km || 
|-id=404 bgcolor=#fefefe
| 281404 ||  || — || September 2, 2008 || Kitt Peak || Spacewatch || MAS || align=right data-sort-value="0.73" | 730 m || 
|-id=405 bgcolor=#fefefe
| 281405 ||  || — || September 3, 2008 || Kitt Peak || Spacewatch || FLO || align=right data-sort-value="0.86" | 860 m || 
|-id=406 bgcolor=#E9E9E9
| 281406 ||  || — || September 3, 2008 || Kitt Peak || Spacewatch || — || align=right | 1.6 km || 
|-id=407 bgcolor=#E9E9E9
| 281407 ||  || — || September 4, 2008 || Kitt Peak || Spacewatch || — || align=right | 1.3 km || 
|-id=408 bgcolor=#fefefe
| 281408 ||  || — || September 4, 2008 || Kitt Peak || Spacewatch || V || align=right data-sort-value="0.87" | 870 m || 
|-id=409 bgcolor=#fefefe
| 281409 ||  || — || September 6, 2008 || Catalina || CSS || — || align=right data-sort-value="0.98" | 980 m || 
|-id=410 bgcolor=#E9E9E9
| 281410 ||  || — || September 5, 2008 || Kitt Peak || Spacewatch || — || align=right | 1.2 km || 
|-id=411 bgcolor=#E9E9E9
| 281411 ||  || — || September 6, 2008 || Catalina || CSS || — || align=right | 2.3 km || 
|-id=412 bgcolor=#d6d6d6
| 281412 ||  || — || September 7, 2008 || Mount Lemmon || Mount Lemmon Survey || — || align=right | 2.8 km || 
|-id=413 bgcolor=#E9E9E9
| 281413 ||  || — || September 2, 2008 || Kitt Peak || Spacewatch || HOF || align=right | 3.0 km || 
|-id=414 bgcolor=#fefefe
| 281414 ||  || — || September 2, 2008 || Kitt Peak || Spacewatch || — || align=right data-sort-value="0.92" | 920 m || 
|-id=415 bgcolor=#E9E9E9
| 281415 ||  || — || September 3, 2008 || Kitt Peak || Spacewatch || — || align=right | 2.0 km || 
|-id=416 bgcolor=#fefefe
| 281416 ||  || — || September 7, 2008 || Mount Lemmon || Mount Lemmon Survey || — || align=right | 1.00 km || 
|-id=417 bgcolor=#E9E9E9
| 281417 ||  || — || September 7, 2008 || Mount Lemmon || Mount Lemmon Survey || AGN || align=right | 1.3 km || 
|-id=418 bgcolor=#fefefe
| 281418 ||  || — || September 7, 2008 || Catalina || CSS || FLO || align=right data-sort-value="0.88" | 880 m || 
|-id=419 bgcolor=#E9E9E9
| 281419 ||  || — || September 9, 2008 || Kitt Peak || Spacewatch || ADE || align=right | 2.1 km || 
|-id=420 bgcolor=#E9E9E9
| 281420 ||  || — || September 7, 2008 || Mount Lemmon || Mount Lemmon Survey || — || align=right | 2.0 km || 
|-id=421 bgcolor=#fefefe
| 281421 ||  || — || September 7, 2008 || Mount Lemmon || Mount Lemmon Survey || NYS || align=right data-sort-value="0.69" | 690 m || 
|-id=422 bgcolor=#E9E9E9
| 281422 ||  || — || September 9, 2008 || Catalina || CSS || — || align=right | 3.6 km || 
|-id=423 bgcolor=#E9E9E9
| 281423 ||  || — || September 6, 2008 || Catalina || CSS || — || align=right | 3.4 km || 
|-id=424 bgcolor=#E9E9E9
| 281424 ||  || — || September 7, 2008 || Socorro || LINEAR || MAR || align=right | 2.7 km || 
|-id=425 bgcolor=#fefefe
| 281425 ||  || — || September 7, 2008 || Socorro || LINEAR || LCI || align=right | 1.4 km || 
|-id=426 bgcolor=#E9E9E9
| 281426 ||  || — || September 23, 2008 || Hibiscus || N. Teamo || MRX || align=right | 1.4 km || 
|-id=427 bgcolor=#E9E9E9
| 281427 ||  || — || September 22, 2008 || Socorro || LINEAR || — || align=right | 1.8 km || 
|-id=428 bgcolor=#fefefe
| 281428 ||  || — || September 22, 2008 || Socorro || LINEAR || NYS || align=right data-sort-value="0.83" | 830 m || 
|-id=429 bgcolor=#E9E9E9
| 281429 ||  || — || September 22, 2008 || Socorro || LINEAR || — || align=right | 2.5 km || 
|-id=430 bgcolor=#fefefe
| 281430 ||  || — || September 22, 2008 || Socorro || LINEAR || FLO || align=right data-sort-value="0.76" | 760 m || 
|-id=431 bgcolor=#fefefe
| 281431 ||  || — || September 22, 2008 || Socorro || LINEAR || FLO || align=right data-sort-value="0.62" | 620 m || 
|-id=432 bgcolor=#fefefe
| 281432 ||  || — || September 22, 2008 || Socorro || LINEAR || — || align=right data-sort-value="0.91" | 910 m || 
|-id=433 bgcolor=#E9E9E9
| 281433 ||  || — || September 22, 2008 || Socorro || LINEAR || — || align=right | 3.2 km || 
|-id=434 bgcolor=#fefefe
| 281434 ||  || — || September 20, 2008 || Catalina || CSS || MAS || align=right | 1.00 km || 
|-id=435 bgcolor=#E9E9E9
| 281435 ||  || — || September 20, 2008 || Kitt Peak || Spacewatch || — || align=right | 2.9 km || 
|-id=436 bgcolor=#fefefe
| 281436 ||  || — || September 20, 2008 || Catalina || CSS || — || align=right | 1.1 km || 
|-id=437 bgcolor=#fefefe
| 281437 ||  || — || September 20, 2008 || Catalina || CSS || FLO || align=right data-sort-value="0.83" | 830 m || 
|-id=438 bgcolor=#E9E9E9
| 281438 ||  || — || September 21, 2008 || Kitt Peak || Spacewatch || — || align=right | 1.5 km || 
|-id=439 bgcolor=#E9E9E9
| 281439 ||  || — || September 22, 2008 || Mount Lemmon || Mount Lemmon Survey || — || align=right | 2.5 km || 
|-id=440 bgcolor=#fefefe
| 281440 ||  || — || September 22, 2008 || Goodricke-Pigott || R. A. Tucker || — || align=right | 1.1 km || 
|-id=441 bgcolor=#E9E9E9
| 281441 ||  || — || September 22, 2008 || Mount Lemmon || Mount Lemmon Survey || — || align=right | 2.7 km || 
|-id=442 bgcolor=#E9E9E9
| 281442 ||  || — || September 23, 2008 || Mount Lemmon || Mount Lemmon Survey || MRX || align=right | 1.3 km || 
|-id=443 bgcolor=#E9E9E9
| 281443 ||  || — || September 23, 2008 || Catalina || CSS || EUN || align=right | 2.3 km || 
|-id=444 bgcolor=#E9E9E9
| 281444 ||  || — || September 27, 2008 || Altschwendt || W. Ries || — || align=right data-sort-value="0.89" | 890 m || 
|-id=445 bgcolor=#E9E9E9
| 281445 Scotthowe ||  ||  || September 28, 2008 || Wrightwood || J. W. Young || WIT || align=right data-sort-value="0.99" | 990 m || 
|-id=446 bgcolor=#E9E9E9
| 281446 ||  || — || September 21, 2008 || Kitt Peak || Spacewatch || — || align=right | 1.8 km || 
|-id=447 bgcolor=#E9E9E9
| 281447 ||  || — || September 21, 2008 || Kitt Peak || Spacewatch || AGN || align=right | 1.7 km || 
|-id=448 bgcolor=#fefefe
| 281448 ||  || — || September 21, 2008 || Kitt Peak || Spacewatch || V || align=right data-sort-value="0.77" | 770 m || 
|-id=449 bgcolor=#E9E9E9
| 281449 ||  || — || September 21, 2008 || Kitt Peak || Spacewatch || — || align=right | 1.9 km || 
|-id=450 bgcolor=#E9E9E9
| 281450 ||  || — || September 21, 2008 || Kitt Peak || Spacewatch || — || align=right | 1.7 km || 
|-id=451 bgcolor=#E9E9E9
| 281451 ||  || — || September 21, 2008 || Kitt Peak || Spacewatch || — || align=right | 1.2 km || 
|-id=452 bgcolor=#fefefe
| 281452 ||  || — || September 21, 2008 || Catalina || CSS || ERI || align=right | 1.9 km || 
|-id=453 bgcolor=#fefefe
| 281453 ||  || — || September 22, 2008 || Kitt Peak || Spacewatch || MAS || align=right data-sort-value="0.80" | 800 m || 
|-id=454 bgcolor=#fefefe
| 281454 ||  || — || September 22, 2008 || Mount Lemmon || Mount Lemmon Survey || NYS || align=right data-sort-value="0.63" | 630 m || 
|-id=455 bgcolor=#E9E9E9
| 281455 ||  || — || September 22, 2008 || Mount Lemmon || Mount Lemmon Survey || — || align=right | 2.1 km || 
|-id=456 bgcolor=#fefefe
| 281456 ||  || — || September 22, 2008 || Kitt Peak || Spacewatch || MAS || align=right data-sort-value="0.86" | 860 m || 
|-id=457 bgcolor=#E9E9E9
| 281457 ||  || — || September 22, 2008 || Kitt Peak || Spacewatch || WIT || align=right | 1.4 km || 
|-id=458 bgcolor=#E9E9E9
| 281458 ||  || — || September 22, 2008 || Kitt Peak || Spacewatch || — || align=right | 2.1 km || 
|-id=459 bgcolor=#fefefe
| 281459 Kyrylenko ||  ||  || September 27, 2008 || Andrushivka || Andrushivka Obs. || — || align=right data-sort-value="0.77" | 770 m || 
|-id=460 bgcolor=#fefefe
| 281460 ||  || — || September 23, 2008 || Socorro || LINEAR || MAS || align=right data-sort-value="0.80" | 800 m || 
|-id=461 bgcolor=#fefefe
| 281461 ||  || — || September 28, 2008 || Socorro || LINEAR || MAS || align=right data-sort-value="0.85" | 850 m || 
|-id=462 bgcolor=#E9E9E9
| 281462 ||  || — || September 28, 2008 || Socorro || LINEAR || — || align=right | 2.9 km || 
|-id=463 bgcolor=#E9E9E9
| 281463 ||  || — || September 28, 2008 || Socorro || LINEAR || — || align=right | 3.6 km || 
|-id=464 bgcolor=#FA8072
| 281464 ||  || — || September 28, 2008 || Socorro || LINEAR || — || align=right | 1.2 km || 
|-id=465 bgcolor=#E9E9E9
| 281465 ||  || — || September 23, 2008 || Mount Lemmon || Mount Lemmon Survey || — || align=right | 1.2 km || 
|-id=466 bgcolor=#E9E9E9
| 281466 ||  || — || September 24, 2008 || Mount Lemmon || Mount Lemmon Survey || — || align=right | 1.6 km || 
|-id=467 bgcolor=#E9E9E9
| 281467 ||  || — || September 24, 2008 || Mount Lemmon || Mount Lemmon Survey || — || align=right | 1.8 km || 
|-id=468 bgcolor=#E9E9E9
| 281468 ||  || — || September 25, 2008 || Kitt Peak || Spacewatch || — || align=right | 2.5 km || 
|-id=469 bgcolor=#fefefe
| 281469 ||  || — || September 25, 2008 || Mount Lemmon || Mount Lemmon Survey || FLO || align=right data-sort-value="0.96" | 960 m || 
|-id=470 bgcolor=#fefefe
| 281470 ||  || — || September 25, 2008 || Mount Lemmon || Mount Lemmon Survey || — || align=right data-sort-value="0.98" | 980 m || 
|-id=471 bgcolor=#E9E9E9
| 281471 ||  || — || September 25, 2008 || Kitt Peak || Spacewatch || HEN || align=right | 1.2 km || 
|-id=472 bgcolor=#E9E9E9
| 281472 ||  || — || September 26, 2008 || Kitt Peak || Spacewatch || WIT || align=right | 1.1 km || 
|-id=473 bgcolor=#E9E9E9
| 281473 ||  || — || September 26, 2008 || Kitt Peak || Spacewatch || MRX || align=right | 1.1 km || 
|-id=474 bgcolor=#E9E9E9
| 281474 ||  || — || September 26, 2008 || Kitt Peak || Spacewatch || — || align=right | 1.5 km || 
|-id=475 bgcolor=#fefefe
| 281475 ||  || — || September 26, 2008 || Kitt Peak || Spacewatch || ERI || align=right | 1.6 km || 
|-id=476 bgcolor=#fefefe
| 281476 ||  || — || September 30, 2008 || La Sagra || OAM Obs. || NYS || align=right data-sort-value="0.67" | 670 m || 
|-id=477 bgcolor=#E9E9E9
| 281477 ||  || — || September 25, 2008 || Kitt Peak || Spacewatch || WIT || align=right | 1.1 km || 
|-id=478 bgcolor=#E9E9E9
| 281478 ||  || — || September 27, 2008 || Mount Lemmon || Mount Lemmon Survey || — || align=right | 3.2 km || 
|-id=479 bgcolor=#E9E9E9
| 281479 ||  || — || September 4, 2008 || Kitt Peak || Spacewatch || — || align=right | 3.1 km || 
|-id=480 bgcolor=#fefefe
| 281480 ||  || — || September 29, 2008 || Catalina || CSS || NYS || align=right data-sort-value="0.78" | 780 m || 
|-id=481 bgcolor=#d6d6d6
| 281481 ||  || — || September 29, 2008 || Kitt Peak || Spacewatch || — || align=right | 3.0 km || 
|-id=482 bgcolor=#E9E9E9
| 281482 ||  || — || September 29, 2008 || Kitt Peak || Spacewatch || HOF || align=right | 3.1 km || 
|-id=483 bgcolor=#fefefe
| 281483 ||  || — || September 29, 2008 || Catalina || CSS || — || align=right | 1.1 km || 
|-id=484 bgcolor=#fefefe
| 281484 ||  || — || September 24, 2008 || Kitt Peak || Spacewatch || MAS || align=right data-sort-value="0.77" | 770 m || 
|-id=485 bgcolor=#E9E9E9
| 281485 ||  || — || September 24, 2008 || Catalina || CSS || — || align=right | 1.5 km || 
|-id=486 bgcolor=#E9E9E9
| 281486 ||  || — || September 24, 2008 || Kitt Peak || Spacewatch || — || align=right | 1.9 km || 
|-id=487 bgcolor=#d6d6d6
| 281487 ||  || — || September 22, 2008 || Mount Lemmon || Mount Lemmon Survey || — || align=right | 3.9 km || 
|-id=488 bgcolor=#E9E9E9
| 281488 ||  || — || September 23, 2008 || Kitt Peak || Spacewatch || — || align=right | 2.5 km || 
|-id=489 bgcolor=#E9E9E9
| 281489 ||  || — || September 23, 2008 || Mount Lemmon || Mount Lemmon Survey || — || align=right | 2.0 km || 
|-id=490 bgcolor=#E9E9E9
| 281490 ||  || — || September 29, 2008 || Catalina || CSS || — || align=right | 3.9 km || 
|-id=491 bgcolor=#E9E9E9
| 281491 ||  || — || September 21, 2008 || Kitt Peak || Spacewatch || — || align=right | 2.6 km || 
|-id=492 bgcolor=#E9E9E9
| 281492 ||  || — || September 23, 2008 || Kitt Peak || Spacewatch || — || align=right | 1.9 km || 
|-id=493 bgcolor=#fefefe
| 281493 ||  || — || September 25, 2008 || Kitt Peak || Spacewatch || — || align=right data-sort-value="0.79" | 790 m || 
|-id=494 bgcolor=#d6d6d6
| 281494 ||  || — || September 29, 2008 || Mount Lemmon || Mount Lemmon Survey || — || align=right | 4.5 km || 
|-id=495 bgcolor=#d6d6d6
| 281495 ||  || — || September 27, 2008 || Mount Lemmon || Mount Lemmon Survey || KOR || align=right | 1.7 km || 
|-id=496 bgcolor=#E9E9E9
| 281496 ||  || — || September 21, 2008 || Kitt Peak || Spacewatch || — || align=right | 2.5 km || 
|-id=497 bgcolor=#E9E9E9
| 281497 ||  || — || September 23, 2008 || Mount Lemmon || Mount Lemmon Survey || HEN || align=right data-sort-value="0.99" | 990 m || 
|-id=498 bgcolor=#E9E9E9
| 281498 ||  || — || September 23, 2008 || Kitt Peak || Spacewatch || — || align=right | 2.6 km || 
|-id=499 bgcolor=#E9E9E9
| 281499 ||  || — || September 29, 2008 || Kitt Peak || Spacewatch || — || align=right | 1.7 km || 
|-id=500 bgcolor=#fefefe
| 281500 ||  || — || September 20, 2008 || Catalina || CSS || — || align=right data-sort-value="0.98" | 980 m || 
|}

281501–281600 

|-bgcolor=#E9E9E9
| 281501 ||  || — || September 22, 2008 || Kitt Peak || Spacewatch || WIT || align=right | 1.4 km || 
|-id=502 bgcolor=#fefefe
| 281502 ||  || — || September 22, 2008 || Socorro || LINEAR || V || align=right data-sort-value="0.90" | 900 m || 
|-id=503 bgcolor=#d6d6d6
| 281503 ||  || — || September 23, 2008 || Kitt Peak || Spacewatch || — || align=right | 3.5 km || 
|-id=504 bgcolor=#E9E9E9
| 281504 ||  || — || September 24, 2008 || Catalina || CSS || — || align=right | 1.9 km || 
|-id=505 bgcolor=#E9E9E9
| 281505 ||  || — || September 29, 2008 || Socorro || LINEAR || WIT || align=right | 1.5 km || 
|-id=506 bgcolor=#E9E9E9
| 281506 ||  || — || September 29, 2008 || Kitt Peak || Spacewatch || — || align=right data-sort-value="0.87" | 870 m || 
|-id=507 bgcolor=#E9E9E9
| 281507 Johnellen ||  ||  || October 7, 2008 || Celbridge || D. McDonald || — || align=right | 2.5 km || 
|-id=508 bgcolor=#E9E9E9
| 281508 ||  || — || October 7, 2008 || Tiki || N. Teamo || — || align=right | 2.6 km || 
|-id=509 bgcolor=#d6d6d6
| 281509 ||  || — || October 1, 2008 || Mount Lemmon || Mount Lemmon Survey || KOR || align=right | 1.5 km || 
|-id=510 bgcolor=#d6d6d6
| 281510 ||  || — || October 1, 2008 || Kitt Peak || Spacewatch || — || align=right | 3.2 km || 
|-id=511 bgcolor=#fefefe
| 281511 ||  || — || October 1, 2008 || Catalina || CSS || FLO || align=right data-sort-value="0.80" | 800 m || 
|-id=512 bgcolor=#E9E9E9
| 281512 ||  || — || October 1, 2008 || Catalina || CSS || GEF || align=right | 2.0 km || 
|-id=513 bgcolor=#E9E9E9
| 281513 ||  || — || October 1, 2008 || Mount Lemmon || Mount Lemmon Survey || — || align=right | 1.1 km || 
|-id=514 bgcolor=#E9E9E9
| 281514 ||  || — || October 1, 2008 || Kitt Peak || Spacewatch || — || align=right | 1.2 km || 
|-id=515 bgcolor=#E9E9E9
| 281515 ||  || — || October 1, 2008 || Kitt Peak || Spacewatch || — || align=right | 2.5 km || 
|-id=516 bgcolor=#E9E9E9
| 281516 ||  || — || October 1, 2008 || Kitt Peak || Spacewatch || GEF || align=right | 1.5 km || 
|-id=517 bgcolor=#E9E9E9
| 281517 ||  || — || October 2, 2008 || Kitt Peak || Spacewatch || WIT || align=right | 1.2 km || 
|-id=518 bgcolor=#E9E9E9
| 281518 ||  || — || October 2, 2008 || Kitt Peak || Spacewatch || HEN || align=right | 1.2 km || 
|-id=519 bgcolor=#fefefe
| 281519 ||  || — || October 2, 2008 || Catalina || CSS || V || align=right data-sort-value="0.82" | 820 m || 
|-id=520 bgcolor=#d6d6d6
| 281520 ||  || — || October 2, 2008 || Kitt Peak || Spacewatch || — || align=right | 3.7 km || 
|-id=521 bgcolor=#E9E9E9
| 281521 ||  || — || October 2, 2008 || Kitt Peak || Spacewatch || — || align=right | 1.2 km || 
|-id=522 bgcolor=#E9E9E9
| 281522 ||  || — || October 2, 2008 || Kitt Peak || Spacewatch || — || align=right | 2.8 km || 
|-id=523 bgcolor=#E9E9E9
| 281523 ||  || — || October 3, 2008 || La Sagra || OAM Obs. || — || align=right | 3.0 km || 
|-id=524 bgcolor=#fefefe
| 281524 ||  || — || October 6, 2008 || Kitt Peak || Spacewatch || — || align=right data-sort-value="0.81" | 810 m || 
|-id=525 bgcolor=#fefefe
| 281525 ||  || — || October 6, 2008 || Kitt Peak || Spacewatch || — || align=right data-sort-value="0.90" | 900 m || 
|-id=526 bgcolor=#d6d6d6
| 281526 ||  || — || October 6, 2008 || Kitt Peak || Spacewatch || CHA || align=right | 2.8 km || 
|-id=527 bgcolor=#d6d6d6
| 281527 ||  || — || October 6, 2008 || Kitt Peak || Spacewatch || THM || align=right | 3.3 km || 
|-id=528 bgcolor=#E9E9E9
| 281528 ||  || — || October 6, 2008 || Catalina || CSS || EUN || align=right | 2.1 km || 
|-id=529 bgcolor=#E9E9E9
| 281529 ||  || — || October 6, 2008 || Kitt Peak || Spacewatch || WIT || align=right | 1.4 km || 
|-id=530 bgcolor=#E9E9E9
| 281530 ||  || — || October 7, 2008 || Kitt Peak || Spacewatch || AGN || align=right | 1.6 km || 
|-id=531 bgcolor=#E9E9E9
| 281531 ||  || — || October 8, 2008 || Mount Lemmon || Mount Lemmon Survey || — || align=right | 1.9 km || 
|-id=532 bgcolor=#fefefe
| 281532 ||  || — || October 9, 2008 || Mount Lemmon || Mount Lemmon Survey || MAS || align=right data-sort-value="0.78" | 780 m || 
|-id=533 bgcolor=#d6d6d6
| 281533 ||  || — || October 1, 2008 || Kitt Peak || Spacewatch || THM || align=right | 2.4 km || 
|-id=534 bgcolor=#E9E9E9
| 281534 ||  || — || October 1, 2008 || Kitt Peak || Spacewatch || — || align=right | 3.3 km || 
|-id=535 bgcolor=#d6d6d6
| 281535 ||  || — || October 10, 2008 || Kitt Peak || Spacewatch || — || align=right | 2.3 km || 
|-id=536 bgcolor=#E9E9E9
| 281536 ||  || — || October 8, 2008 || Kitt Peak || Spacewatch || — || align=right | 1.6 km || 
|-id=537 bgcolor=#E9E9E9
| 281537 ||  || — || October 4, 2008 || La Sagra || OAM Obs. || — || align=right | 2.2 km || 
|-id=538 bgcolor=#E9E9E9
| 281538 ||  || — || October 1, 2008 || Kitt Peak || Spacewatch || AGN || align=right | 1.6 km || 
|-id=539 bgcolor=#d6d6d6
| 281539 ||  || — || October 2, 2008 || Kitt Peak || Spacewatch || THM || align=right | 2.7 km || 
|-id=540 bgcolor=#E9E9E9
| 281540 ||  || — || October 10, 2008 || Kitt Peak || Spacewatch || — || align=right | 1.6 km || 
|-id=541 bgcolor=#E9E9E9
| 281541 ||  || — || October 20, 2008 || Kitt Peak || Spacewatch || — || align=right | 1.1 km || 
|-id=542 bgcolor=#E9E9E9
| 281542 ||  || — || October 19, 2008 || Kitt Peak || Spacewatch || — || align=right | 1.3 km || 
|-id=543 bgcolor=#E9E9E9
| 281543 ||  || — || October 20, 2008 || Kitt Peak || Spacewatch || — || align=right | 1.2 km || 
|-id=544 bgcolor=#E9E9E9
| 281544 ||  || — || October 20, 2008 || Kitt Peak || Spacewatch || — || align=right | 2.4 km || 
|-id=545 bgcolor=#d6d6d6
| 281545 ||  || — || October 20, 2008 || Kitt Peak || Spacewatch || KOR || align=right | 1.3 km || 
|-id=546 bgcolor=#E9E9E9
| 281546 ||  || — || October 20, 2008 || Kitt Peak || Spacewatch || — || align=right | 3.1 km || 
|-id=547 bgcolor=#E9E9E9
| 281547 ||  || — || October 20, 2008 || Kitt Peak || Spacewatch || HOF || align=right | 3.3 km || 
|-id=548 bgcolor=#d6d6d6
| 281548 ||  || — || October 20, 2008 || Kitt Peak || Spacewatch || — || align=right | 2.8 km || 
|-id=549 bgcolor=#E9E9E9
| 281549 ||  || — || October 20, 2008 || Kitt Peak || Spacewatch || HEN || align=right | 1.4 km || 
|-id=550 bgcolor=#E9E9E9
| 281550 ||  || — || October 20, 2008 || Kitt Peak || Spacewatch || — || align=right | 2.9 km || 
|-id=551 bgcolor=#E9E9E9
| 281551 ||  || — || October 20, 2008 || Kitt Peak || Spacewatch || — || align=right | 1.6 km || 
|-id=552 bgcolor=#E9E9E9
| 281552 ||  || — || October 20, 2008 || Kitt Peak || Spacewatch || — || align=right | 1.7 km || 
|-id=553 bgcolor=#E9E9E9
| 281553 ||  || — || October 20, 2008 || Mount Lemmon || Mount Lemmon Survey || RAF || align=right | 1.4 km || 
|-id=554 bgcolor=#d6d6d6
| 281554 ||  || — || October 20, 2008 || Mount Lemmon || Mount Lemmon Survey || CHA || align=right | 3.0 km || 
|-id=555 bgcolor=#E9E9E9
| 281555 ||  || — || October 21, 2008 || Kitt Peak || Spacewatch || — || align=right | 1.3 km || 
|-id=556 bgcolor=#E9E9E9
| 281556 ||  || — || October 21, 2008 || Mount Lemmon || Mount Lemmon Survey || RAF || align=right | 1.6 km || 
|-id=557 bgcolor=#d6d6d6
| 281557 ||  || — || October 21, 2008 || Kitt Peak || Spacewatch || — || align=right | 4.8 km || 
|-id=558 bgcolor=#d6d6d6
| 281558 ||  || — || October 21, 2008 || Kitt Peak || Spacewatch || — || align=right | 4.2 km || 
|-id=559 bgcolor=#d6d6d6
| 281559 ||  || — || October 21, 2008 || Kitt Peak || Spacewatch || — || align=right | 3.8 km || 
|-id=560 bgcolor=#E9E9E9
| 281560 ||  || — || October 21, 2008 || Kitt Peak || Spacewatch || — || align=right | 2.9 km || 
|-id=561 bgcolor=#d6d6d6
| 281561 Taitung ||  ||  || October 21, 2008 || Lulin Observatory || X. Y. Hsiao, Q.-z. Ye || — || align=right | 3.0 km || 
|-id=562 bgcolor=#E9E9E9
| 281562 ||  || — || October 23, 2008 || Mount Lemmon || Mount Lemmon Survey || — || align=right | 3.1 km || 
|-id=563 bgcolor=#E9E9E9
| 281563 ||  || — || October 23, 2008 || Mount Lemmon || Mount Lemmon Survey || HEN || align=right | 1.3 km || 
|-id=564 bgcolor=#E9E9E9
| 281564 Fuhsiehhai ||  ||  || October 23, 2008 || Lulin Observatory || X. Y. Hsiao, Q.-z. Ye || — || align=right | 3.5 km || 
|-id=565 bgcolor=#E9E9E9
| 281565 ||  || — || October 24, 2008 || Mount Lemmon || Mount Lemmon Survey || NEM || align=right | 2.6 km || 
|-id=566 bgcolor=#E9E9E9
| 281566 ||  || — || October 24, 2008 || Socorro || LINEAR || — || align=right | 3.6 km || 
|-id=567 bgcolor=#E9E9E9
| 281567 ||  || — || October 24, 2008 || Socorro || LINEAR || GEF || align=right | 1.6 km || 
|-id=568 bgcolor=#d6d6d6
| 281568 ||  || — || October 24, 2008 || Socorro || LINEAR || — || align=right | 5.7 km || 
|-id=569 bgcolor=#fefefe
| 281569 Taea ||  ||  || October 23, 2008 || Lulin || X. Y. Hsiao, Q.-z. Ye || — || align=right data-sort-value="0.94" | 940 m || 
|-id=570 bgcolor=#E9E9E9
| 281570 ||  || — || October 25, 2008 || Socorro || LINEAR || — || align=right | 2.4 km || 
|-id=571 bgcolor=#E9E9E9
| 281571 ||  || — || October 26, 2008 || Socorro || LINEAR || — || align=right | 2.0 km || 
|-id=572 bgcolor=#E9E9E9
| 281572 ||  || — || October 27, 2008 || Bisei SG Center || BATTeRS || — || align=right | 2.2 km || 
|-id=573 bgcolor=#E9E9E9
| 281573 ||  || — || October 20, 2008 || Kitt Peak || Spacewatch || — || align=right | 1.2 km || 
|-id=574 bgcolor=#d6d6d6
| 281574 ||  || — || October 21, 2008 || Kitt Peak || Spacewatch || — || align=right | 5.0 km || 
|-id=575 bgcolor=#E9E9E9
| 281575 ||  || — || October 22, 2008 || Kitt Peak || Spacewatch || — || align=right | 2.8 km || 
|-id=576 bgcolor=#d6d6d6
| 281576 ||  || — || October 22, 2008 || Kitt Peak || Spacewatch || TEL || align=right | 2.0 km || 
|-id=577 bgcolor=#E9E9E9
| 281577 ||  || — || October 22, 2008 || Kitt Peak || Spacewatch || WIT || align=right | 1.4 km || 
|-id=578 bgcolor=#E9E9E9
| 281578 ||  || — || October 22, 2008 || Kitt Peak || Spacewatch || — || align=right | 3.8 km || 
|-id=579 bgcolor=#E9E9E9
| 281579 ||  || — || October 23, 2008 || Kitt Peak || Spacewatch || — || align=right | 1.7 km || 
|-id=580 bgcolor=#d6d6d6
| 281580 ||  || — || October 23, 2008 || Kitt Peak || Spacewatch || EOS || align=right | 2.6 km || 
|-id=581 bgcolor=#d6d6d6
| 281581 ||  || — || October 23, 2008 || Kitt Peak || Spacewatch || — || align=right | 6.6 km || 
|-id=582 bgcolor=#E9E9E9
| 281582 ||  || — || October 23, 2008 || Kitt Peak || Spacewatch || HOF || align=right | 3.3 km || 
|-id=583 bgcolor=#d6d6d6
| 281583 ||  || — || October 23, 2008 || Kitt Peak || Spacewatch || EOS || align=right | 2.1 km || 
|-id=584 bgcolor=#E9E9E9
| 281584 ||  || — || October 23, 2008 || Kitt Peak || Spacewatch || — || align=right | 2.6 km || 
|-id=585 bgcolor=#d6d6d6
| 281585 ||  || — || October 23, 2008 || Kitt Peak || Spacewatch || — || align=right | 2.7 km || 
|-id=586 bgcolor=#fefefe
| 281586 ||  || — || October 23, 2008 || Kitt Peak || Spacewatch || — || align=right data-sort-value="0.91" | 910 m || 
|-id=587 bgcolor=#E9E9E9
| 281587 ||  || — || October 23, 2008 || Kitt Peak || Spacewatch || — || align=right | 3.0 km || 
|-id=588 bgcolor=#d6d6d6
| 281588 ||  || — || October 23, 2008 || Kitt Peak || Spacewatch || — || align=right | 2.5 km || 
|-id=589 bgcolor=#d6d6d6
| 281589 ||  || — || October 23, 2008 || Kitt Peak || Spacewatch || KOR || align=right | 1.5 km || 
|-id=590 bgcolor=#E9E9E9
| 281590 ||  || — || October 23, 2008 || Kitt Peak || Spacewatch || — || align=right | 2.9 km || 
|-id=591 bgcolor=#d6d6d6
| 281591 ||  || — || October 23, 2008 || Kitt Peak || Spacewatch || EOS || align=right | 2.2 km || 
|-id=592 bgcolor=#E9E9E9
| 281592 ||  || — || October 23, 2008 || Kitt Peak || Spacewatch || ADE || align=right | 3.3 km || 
|-id=593 bgcolor=#E9E9E9
| 281593 ||  || — || October 23, 2008 || Kitt Peak || Spacewatch || NEM || align=right | 2.4 km || 
|-id=594 bgcolor=#E9E9E9
| 281594 ||  || — || October 23, 2008 || Mount Lemmon || Mount Lemmon Survey || — || align=right | 2.6 km || 
|-id=595 bgcolor=#E9E9E9
| 281595 ||  || — || October 23, 2008 || Mount Lemmon || Mount Lemmon Survey || MAR || align=right | 1.4 km || 
|-id=596 bgcolor=#E9E9E9
| 281596 ||  || — || October 24, 2008 || Kitt Peak || Spacewatch || — || align=right | 3.0 km || 
|-id=597 bgcolor=#d6d6d6
| 281597 ||  || — || October 24, 2008 || Kitt Peak || Spacewatch || — || align=right | 2.5 km || 
|-id=598 bgcolor=#E9E9E9
| 281598 ||  || — || October 24, 2008 || Kitt Peak || Spacewatch || — || align=right data-sort-value="0.96" | 960 m || 
|-id=599 bgcolor=#E9E9E9
| 281599 ||  || — || October 24, 2008 || Mount Lemmon || Mount Lemmon Survey || — || align=right | 2.4 km || 
|-id=600 bgcolor=#E9E9E9
| 281600 ||  || — || October 24, 2008 || Kitt Peak || Spacewatch || — || align=right | 1.5 km || 
|}

281601–281700 

|-bgcolor=#d6d6d6
| 281601 ||  || — || October 24, 2008 || Mount Lemmon || Mount Lemmon Survey || — || align=right | 5.0 km || 
|-id=602 bgcolor=#d6d6d6
| 281602 ||  || — || October 24, 2008 || Kitt Peak || Spacewatch || — || align=right | 2.9 km || 
|-id=603 bgcolor=#d6d6d6
| 281603 ||  || — || October 24, 2008 || Kitt Peak || Spacewatch || — || align=right | 3.9 km || 
|-id=604 bgcolor=#E9E9E9
| 281604 ||  || — || October 24, 2008 || Kitt Peak || Spacewatch || — || align=right | 1.6 km || 
|-id=605 bgcolor=#E9E9E9
| 281605 ||  || — || October 26, 2008 || Socorro || LINEAR || MAR || align=right | 3.3 km || 
|-id=606 bgcolor=#E9E9E9
| 281606 ||  || — || October 27, 2008 || Socorro || LINEAR || — || align=right | 2.8 km || 
|-id=607 bgcolor=#E9E9E9
| 281607 ||  || — || October 28, 2008 || Socorro || LINEAR || — || align=right | 1.7 km || 
|-id=608 bgcolor=#E9E9E9
| 281608 ||  || — || October 28, 2008 || Socorro || LINEAR || WIT || align=right | 1.4 km || 
|-id=609 bgcolor=#E9E9E9
| 281609 ||  || — || October 28, 2008 || Socorro || LINEAR || — || align=right | 2.3 km || 
|-id=610 bgcolor=#E9E9E9
| 281610 ||  || — || October 23, 2008 || Kitt Peak || Spacewatch || RAF || align=right | 1.1 km || 
|-id=611 bgcolor=#E9E9E9
| 281611 ||  || — || October 23, 2008 || Kitt Peak || Spacewatch || HOF || align=right | 2.2 km || 
|-id=612 bgcolor=#E9E9E9
| 281612 ||  || — || October 23, 2008 || Mount Lemmon || Mount Lemmon Survey || — || align=right | 2.9 km || 
|-id=613 bgcolor=#E9E9E9
| 281613 ||  || — || October 24, 2008 || Catalina || CSS || IAN || align=right | 1.4 km || 
|-id=614 bgcolor=#E9E9E9
| 281614 ||  || — || October 24, 2008 || Catalina || CSS || CLO || align=right | 2.7 km || 
|-id=615 bgcolor=#d6d6d6
| 281615 ||  || — || October 25, 2008 || Kitt Peak || Spacewatch || — || align=right | 3.9 km || 
|-id=616 bgcolor=#E9E9E9
| 281616 ||  || — || October 25, 2008 || Catalina || CSS || — || align=right | 2.8 km || 
|-id=617 bgcolor=#E9E9E9
| 281617 ||  || — || October 26, 2008 || Kitt Peak || Spacewatch || WIT || align=right | 1.2 km || 
|-id=618 bgcolor=#d6d6d6
| 281618 ||  || — || October 26, 2008 || Kitt Peak || Spacewatch || EOS || align=right | 3.0 km || 
|-id=619 bgcolor=#d6d6d6
| 281619 ||  || — || October 27, 2008 || Kitt Peak || Spacewatch || KOR || align=right | 1.7 km || 
|-id=620 bgcolor=#E9E9E9
| 281620 ||  || — || October 27, 2008 || Kitt Peak || Spacewatch || — || align=right | 1.7 km || 
|-id=621 bgcolor=#d6d6d6
| 281621 ||  || — || October 27, 2008 || Kitt Peak || Spacewatch || EOS || align=right | 2.3 km || 
|-id=622 bgcolor=#E9E9E9
| 281622 ||  || — || October 28, 2008 || Kitt Peak || Spacewatch || HOF || align=right | 3.7 km || 
|-id=623 bgcolor=#E9E9E9
| 281623 ||  || — || October 28, 2008 || Kitt Peak || Spacewatch || — || align=right | 2.9 km || 
|-id=624 bgcolor=#E9E9E9
| 281624 ||  || — || October 28, 2008 || Kitt Peak || Spacewatch || — || align=right | 1.2 km || 
|-id=625 bgcolor=#E9E9E9
| 281625 ||  || — || October 28, 2008 || Kitt Peak || Spacewatch || — || align=right | 2.5 km || 
|-id=626 bgcolor=#E9E9E9
| 281626 ||  || — || October 28, 2008 || Mount Lemmon || Mount Lemmon Survey || — || align=right | 2.6 km || 
|-id=627 bgcolor=#E9E9E9
| 281627 ||  || — || October 28, 2008 || Mount Lemmon || Mount Lemmon Survey || WIT || align=right | 1.2 km || 
|-id=628 bgcolor=#E9E9E9
| 281628 ||  || — || October 28, 2008 || Mount Lemmon || Mount Lemmon Survey || — || align=right | 2.4 km || 
|-id=629 bgcolor=#d6d6d6
| 281629 ||  || — || October 29, 2008 || Kitt Peak || Spacewatch || — || align=right | 2.8 km || 
|-id=630 bgcolor=#E9E9E9
| 281630 ||  || — || October 29, 2008 || Kitt Peak || Spacewatch || — || align=right | 1.9 km || 
|-id=631 bgcolor=#E9E9E9
| 281631 ||  || — || October 29, 2008 || Kitt Peak || Spacewatch || — || align=right | 3.0 km || 
|-id=632 bgcolor=#fefefe
| 281632 ||  || — || October 29, 2008 || Mount Lemmon || Mount Lemmon Survey || — || align=right data-sort-value="0.90" | 900 m || 
|-id=633 bgcolor=#E9E9E9
| 281633 ||  || — || October 30, 2008 || Catalina || CSS || — || align=right | 1.8 km || 
|-id=634 bgcolor=#E9E9E9
| 281634 ||  || — || October 30, 2008 || Kitt Peak || Spacewatch || — || align=right | 1.5 km || 
|-id=635 bgcolor=#E9E9E9
| 281635 ||  || — || October 30, 2008 || Kitt Peak || Spacewatch || — || align=right | 2.6 km || 
|-id=636 bgcolor=#E9E9E9
| 281636 ||  || — || October 30, 2008 || Kitt Peak || Spacewatch || — || align=right | 2.0 km || 
|-id=637 bgcolor=#E9E9E9
| 281637 ||  || — || October 30, 2008 || Kitt Peak || Spacewatch || — || align=right | 1.4 km || 
|-id=638 bgcolor=#E9E9E9
| 281638 ||  || — || October 30, 2008 || Kitt Peak || Spacewatch || — || align=right | 1.2 km || 
|-id=639 bgcolor=#E9E9E9
| 281639 ||  || — || October 31, 2008 || Kachina || J. Hobart || — || align=right | 1.7 km || 
|-id=640 bgcolor=#fefefe
| 281640 ||  || — || October 20, 2008 || Kitt Peak || Spacewatch || NYS || align=right data-sort-value="0.72" | 720 m || 
|-id=641 bgcolor=#d6d6d6
| 281641 ||  || — || October 21, 2008 || Kitt Peak || Spacewatch || — || align=right | 3.1 km || 
|-id=642 bgcolor=#E9E9E9
| 281642 ||  || — || October 20, 2008 || Kitt Peak || Spacewatch || — || align=right | 3.7 km || 
|-id=643 bgcolor=#d6d6d6
| 281643 ||  || — || October 20, 2008 || Kitt Peak || Spacewatch || — || align=right | 3.4 km || 
|-id=644 bgcolor=#fefefe
| 281644 ||  || — || October 20, 2008 || Kitt Peak || Spacewatch || MAS || align=right data-sort-value="0.79" | 790 m || 
|-id=645 bgcolor=#d6d6d6
| 281645 ||  || — || October 20, 2008 || Kitt Peak || Spacewatch || — || align=right | 3.6 km || 
|-id=646 bgcolor=#E9E9E9
| 281646 ||  || — || October 20, 2008 || Kitt Peak || Spacewatch || GEF || align=right | 1.6 km || 
|-id=647 bgcolor=#d6d6d6
| 281647 ||  || — || October 22, 2008 || Mount Lemmon || Mount Lemmon Survey || — || align=right | 2.7 km || 
|-id=648 bgcolor=#E9E9E9
| 281648 ||  || — || October 23, 2008 || Kitt Peak || Spacewatch || HOF || align=right | 3.1 km || 
|-id=649 bgcolor=#E9E9E9
| 281649 ||  || — || October 28, 2008 || Mount Lemmon || Mount Lemmon Survey || — || align=right | 2.3 km || 
|-id=650 bgcolor=#E9E9E9
| 281650 ||  || — || October 20, 2008 || Mount Lemmon || Mount Lemmon Survey || HOF || align=right | 2.5 km || 
|-id=651 bgcolor=#E9E9E9
| 281651 ||  || — || October 30, 2008 || Kitt Peak || Spacewatch || NEM || align=right | 2.8 km || 
|-id=652 bgcolor=#d6d6d6
| 281652 ||  || — || October 23, 2008 || Kitt Peak || Spacewatch || — || align=right | 4.3 km || 
|-id=653 bgcolor=#d6d6d6
| 281653 ||  || — || October 27, 2008 || Kitt Peak || Spacewatch || EOS || align=right | 2.0 km || 
|-id=654 bgcolor=#d6d6d6
| 281654 ||  || — || October 23, 2008 || Kitt Peak || Spacewatch || — || align=right | 4.3 km || 
|-id=655 bgcolor=#d6d6d6
| 281655 ||  || — || October 28, 2008 || Kitt Peak || Spacewatch || K-2 || align=right | 1.4 km || 
|-id=656 bgcolor=#E9E9E9
| 281656 ||  || — || October 23, 2008 || Mount Lemmon || Mount Lemmon Survey || — || align=right | 1.5 km || 
|-id=657 bgcolor=#d6d6d6
| 281657 ||  || — || October 27, 2008 || Mount Lemmon || Mount Lemmon Survey || — || align=right | 4.1 km || 
|-id=658 bgcolor=#d6d6d6
| 281658 ||  || — || October 24, 2008 || Catalina || CSS || — || align=right | 3.7 km || 
|-id=659 bgcolor=#E9E9E9
| 281659 ||  || — || November 2, 2008 || Mount Lemmon || Mount Lemmon Survey || — || align=right | 1.9 km || 
|-id=660 bgcolor=#E9E9E9
| 281660 ||  || — || November 5, 2008 || Ondřejov || Ondřejov Obs. || — || align=right | 1.6 km || 
|-id=661 bgcolor=#fefefe
| 281661 Michaelsiems ||  ||  || November 8, 2008 || Tzec Maun || E. Schwab || — || align=right | 1.0 km || 
|-id=662 bgcolor=#E9E9E9
| 281662 ||  || — || November 1, 2008 || Kitt Peak || Spacewatch || AGN || align=right | 1.5 km || 
|-id=663 bgcolor=#E9E9E9
| 281663 ||  || — || November 1, 2008 || Kitt Peak || Spacewatch || — || align=right | 1.6 km || 
|-id=664 bgcolor=#d6d6d6
| 281664 ||  || — || November 1, 2008 || Mount Lemmon || Mount Lemmon Survey || TEL || align=right | 1.9 km || 
|-id=665 bgcolor=#d6d6d6
| 281665 ||  || — || November 1, 2008 || Kitt Peak || Spacewatch || — || align=right | 2.8 km || 
|-id=666 bgcolor=#E9E9E9
| 281666 ||  || — || November 2, 2008 || Kitt Peak || Spacewatch || — || align=right | 1.8 km || 
|-id=667 bgcolor=#E9E9E9
| 281667 ||  || — || November 2, 2008 || Mount Lemmon || Mount Lemmon Survey || — || align=right | 3.1 km || 
|-id=668 bgcolor=#d6d6d6
| 281668 ||  || — || November 3, 2008 || Kitt Peak || Spacewatch || — || align=right | 4.6 km || 
|-id=669 bgcolor=#d6d6d6
| 281669 ||  || — || November 4, 2008 || Kitt Peak || Spacewatch || — || align=right | 3.6 km || 
|-id=670 bgcolor=#E9E9E9
| 281670 ||  || — || November 6, 2008 || Mount Lemmon || Mount Lemmon Survey || — || align=right | 2.0 km || 
|-id=671 bgcolor=#E9E9E9
| 281671 ||  || — || November 6, 2008 || Kitt Peak || Spacewatch || — || align=right | 2.9 km || 
|-id=672 bgcolor=#E9E9E9
| 281672 ||  || — || November 7, 2008 || Mount Lemmon || Mount Lemmon Survey || — || align=right | 2.1 km || 
|-id=673 bgcolor=#d6d6d6
| 281673 ||  || — || November 8, 2008 || Kitt Peak || Spacewatch || — || align=right | 3.2 km || 
|-id=674 bgcolor=#d6d6d6
| 281674 ||  || — || November 1, 2008 || Mount Lemmon || Mount Lemmon Survey || — || align=right | 3.3 km || 
|-id=675 bgcolor=#d6d6d6
| 281675 ||  || — || November 6, 2008 || Catalina || CSS || — || align=right | 4.0 km || 
|-id=676 bgcolor=#E9E9E9
| 281676 ||  || — || November 1, 2008 || Mount Lemmon || Mount Lemmon Survey || — || align=right | 2.7 km || 
|-id=677 bgcolor=#d6d6d6
| 281677 ||  || — || November 7, 2008 || Mount Lemmon || Mount Lemmon Survey || — || align=right | 3.8 km || 
|-id=678 bgcolor=#d6d6d6
| 281678 ||  || — || November 7, 2008 || Mount Lemmon || Mount Lemmon Survey || — || align=right | 3.2 km || 
|-id=679 bgcolor=#d6d6d6
| 281679 ||  || — || November 18, 2008 || Socorro || LINEAR || TIR || align=right | 4.0 km || 
|-id=680 bgcolor=#d6d6d6
| 281680 ||  || — || November 17, 2008 || Kitt Peak || Spacewatch || THM || align=right | 2.7 km || 
|-id=681 bgcolor=#d6d6d6
| 281681 ||  || — || November 17, 2008 || Kitt Peak || Spacewatch || AST || align=right | 1.6 km || 
|-id=682 bgcolor=#E9E9E9
| 281682 ||  || — || November 17, 2008 || Kitt Peak || Spacewatch || — || align=right | 2.0 km || 
|-id=683 bgcolor=#E9E9E9
| 281683 ||  || — || November 19, 2008 || Socorro || LINEAR || — || align=right | 2.1 km || 
|-id=684 bgcolor=#E9E9E9
| 281684 ||  || — || November 18, 2008 || Catalina || CSS || — || align=right | 1.3 km || 
|-id=685 bgcolor=#d6d6d6
| 281685 ||  || — || November 18, 2008 || Catalina || CSS || — || align=right | 3.2 km || 
|-id=686 bgcolor=#E9E9E9
| 281686 ||  || — || November 19, 2008 || Mount Lemmon || Mount Lemmon Survey || — || align=right | 2.1 km || 
|-id=687 bgcolor=#E9E9E9
| 281687 ||  || — || November 17, 2008 || Kitt Peak || Spacewatch || — || align=right | 1.7 km || 
|-id=688 bgcolor=#E9E9E9
| 281688 ||  || — || November 17, 2008 || Kitt Peak || Spacewatch || — || align=right | 2.8 km || 
|-id=689 bgcolor=#fefefe
| 281689 ||  || — || November 17, 2008 || Kitt Peak || Spacewatch || — || align=right | 1.5 km || 
|-id=690 bgcolor=#E9E9E9
| 281690 ||  || — || November 17, 2008 || Kitt Peak || Spacewatch || — || align=right | 3.5 km || 
|-id=691 bgcolor=#d6d6d6
| 281691 ||  || — || November 18, 2008 || Catalina || CSS || EMA || align=right | 4.2 km || 
|-id=692 bgcolor=#fefefe
| 281692 ||  || — || November 18, 2008 || Catalina || CSS || NYS || align=right data-sort-value="0.85" | 850 m || 
|-id=693 bgcolor=#E9E9E9
| 281693 ||  || — || November 18, 2008 || Kitt Peak || Spacewatch || AST || align=right | 2.1 km || 
|-id=694 bgcolor=#E9E9E9
| 281694 ||  || — || November 19, 2008 || Kitt Peak || Spacewatch || NEM || align=right | 2.3 km || 
|-id=695 bgcolor=#E9E9E9
| 281695 ||  || — || November 18, 2008 || Socorro || LINEAR || — || align=right | 1.2 km || 
|-id=696 bgcolor=#E9E9E9
| 281696 ||  || — || November 18, 2008 || Socorro || LINEAR || — || align=right | 2.2 km || 
|-id=697 bgcolor=#d6d6d6
| 281697 ||  || — || November 19, 2008 || Socorro || LINEAR || — || align=right | 4.2 km || 
|-id=698 bgcolor=#fefefe
| 281698 ||  || — || November 23, 2008 || Calvin-Rehoboth || L. A. Molnar || — || align=right | 3.0 km || 
|-id=699 bgcolor=#E9E9E9
| 281699 ||  || — || November 18, 2008 || Kitt Peak || Spacewatch || — || align=right | 1.2 km || 
|-id=700 bgcolor=#d6d6d6
| 281700 ||  || — || November 19, 2008 || Mount Lemmon || Mount Lemmon Survey || HYG || align=right | 2.9 km || 
|}

281701–281800 

|-bgcolor=#E9E9E9
| 281701 ||  || — || November 20, 2008 || Kitt Peak || Spacewatch || — || align=right | 2.4 km || 
|-id=702 bgcolor=#d6d6d6
| 281702 ||  || — || November 20, 2008 || Kitt Peak || Spacewatch || — || align=right | 3.3 km || 
|-id=703 bgcolor=#E9E9E9
| 281703 ||  || — || November 23, 2008 || Mount Lemmon || Mount Lemmon Survey || AGN || align=right | 1.3 km || 
|-id=704 bgcolor=#d6d6d6
| 281704 ||  || — || November 21, 2008 || Kitt Peak || Spacewatch || KOR || align=right | 1.6 km || 
|-id=705 bgcolor=#d6d6d6
| 281705 ||  || — || November 23, 2008 || Socorro || LINEAR || EUP || align=right | 5.2 km || 
|-id=706 bgcolor=#E9E9E9
| 281706 ||  || — || November 23, 2008 || Socorro || LINEAR || — || align=right | 2.1 km || 
|-id=707 bgcolor=#d6d6d6
| 281707 ||  || — || November 18, 2008 || Catalina || CSS || — || align=right | 4.1 km || 
|-id=708 bgcolor=#E9E9E9
| 281708 ||  || — || November 23, 2008 || La Sagra || OAM Obs. || — || align=right | 2.2 km || 
|-id=709 bgcolor=#d6d6d6
| 281709 ||  || — || November 27, 2008 || La Sagra || OAM Obs. || — || align=right | 4.5 km || 
|-id=710 bgcolor=#E9E9E9
| 281710 ||  || — || November 30, 2008 || Mount Lemmon || Mount Lemmon Survey || HEN || align=right | 1.4 km || 
|-id=711 bgcolor=#d6d6d6
| 281711 ||  || — || November 30, 2008 || Mount Lemmon || Mount Lemmon Survey || KOR || align=right | 1.6 km || 
|-id=712 bgcolor=#E9E9E9
| 281712 ||  || — || November 30, 2008 || Kitt Peak || Spacewatch || NEM || align=right | 3.3 km || 
|-id=713 bgcolor=#E9E9E9
| 281713 ||  || — || November 30, 2008 || Mount Lemmon || Mount Lemmon Survey || AGN || align=right | 1.3 km || 
|-id=714 bgcolor=#E9E9E9
| 281714 ||  || — || November 30, 2008 || Catalina || CSS || NEM || align=right | 2.4 km || 
|-id=715 bgcolor=#E9E9E9
| 281715 ||  || — || November 30, 2008 || Catalina || CSS || — || align=right | 1.7 km || 
|-id=716 bgcolor=#d6d6d6
| 281716 ||  || — || November 30, 2008 || Kitt Peak || Spacewatch || — || align=right | 4.2 km || 
|-id=717 bgcolor=#d6d6d6
| 281717 ||  || — || November 30, 2008 || Kitt Peak || Spacewatch || — || align=right | 4.9 km || 
|-id=718 bgcolor=#d6d6d6
| 281718 ||  || — || November 30, 2008 || Kitt Peak || Spacewatch || — || align=right | 2.8 km || 
|-id=719 bgcolor=#d6d6d6
| 281719 ||  || — || November 30, 2008 || Mount Lemmon || Mount Lemmon Survey || — || align=right | 2.5 km || 
|-id=720 bgcolor=#d6d6d6
| 281720 ||  || — || November 30, 2008 || Kitt Peak || Spacewatch || — || align=right | 4.3 km || 
|-id=721 bgcolor=#E9E9E9
| 281721 ||  || — || November 30, 2008 || Mount Lemmon || Mount Lemmon Survey || — || align=right | 1.7 km || 
|-id=722 bgcolor=#d6d6d6
| 281722 ||  || — || November 17, 2008 || Catalina || CSS || — || align=right | 3.8 km || 
|-id=723 bgcolor=#d6d6d6
| 281723 ||  || — || November 19, 2008 || Kitt Peak || Spacewatch || EOS || align=right | 2.6 km || 
|-id=724 bgcolor=#E9E9E9
| 281724 ||  || — || November 19, 2008 || Kitt Peak || Spacewatch || — || align=right | 1.7 km || 
|-id=725 bgcolor=#fefefe
| 281725 ||  || — || November 20, 2008 || Kitt Peak || Spacewatch || MAS || align=right data-sort-value="0.93" | 930 m || 
|-id=726 bgcolor=#d6d6d6
| 281726 ||  || — || September 8, 2007 || Anderson Mesa || LONEOS || — || align=right | 4.1 km || 
|-id=727 bgcolor=#E9E9E9
| 281727 ||  || — || December 2, 2008 || Mayhill || A. Lowe || — || align=right | 3.5 km || 
|-id=728 bgcolor=#E9E9E9
| 281728 ||  || — || December 2, 2008 || Mount Lemmon || Mount Lemmon Survey || — || align=right | 3.2 km || 
|-id=729 bgcolor=#d6d6d6
| 281729 ||  || — || December 1, 2008 || Kitt Peak || Spacewatch || KOR || align=right | 1.5 km || 
|-id=730 bgcolor=#E9E9E9
| 281730 ||  || — || December 2, 2008 || Kitt Peak || Spacewatch || — || align=right | 3.2 km || 
|-id=731 bgcolor=#d6d6d6
| 281731 ||  || — || December 1, 2008 || Socorro || LINEAR || — || align=right | 4.3 km || 
|-id=732 bgcolor=#d6d6d6
| 281732 ||  || — || December 1, 2008 || Socorro || LINEAR || 628 || align=right | 2.5 km || 
|-id=733 bgcolor=#d6d6d6
| 281733 ||  || — || December 2, 2008 || Kitt Peak || Spacewatch || — || align=right | 4.8 km || 
|-id=734 bgcolor=#d6d6d6
| 281734 ||  || — || December 19, 2008 || La Sagra || OAM Obs. || EOS || align=right | 2.9 km || 
|-id=735 bgcolor=#E9E9E9
| 281735 ||  || — || December 23, 2008 || Dauban || F. Kugel || — || align=right | 1.8 km || 
|-id=736 bgcolor=#d6d6d6
| 281736 ||  || — || December 21, 2008 || Mount Lemmon || Mount Lemmon Survey || CHA || align=right | 2.3 km || 
|-id=737 bgcolor=#d6d6d6
| 281737 ||  || — || December 21, 2008 || Mount Lemmon || Mount Lemmon Survey || ALA || align=right | 4.6 km || 
|-id=738 bgcolor=#fefefe
| 281738 ||  || — || December 21, 2008 || Mount Lemmon || Mount Lemmon Survey || LCI || align=right | 1.4 km || 
|-id=739 bgcolor=#d6d6d6
| 281739 ||  || — || December 21, 2008 || Mount Lemmon || Mount Lemmon Survey || SYL7:4 || align=right | 5.6 km || 
|-id=740 bgcolor=#E9E9E9
| 281740 ||  || — || December 22, 2008 || Socorro || LINEAR || — || align=right | 1.3 km || 
|-id=741 bgcolor=#d6d6d6
| 281741 ||  || — || December 30, 2008 || Kitt Peak || Spacewatch || HYG || align=right | 3.3 km || 
|-id=742 bgcolor=#d6d6d6
| 281742 ||  || — || December 29, 2008 || Kitt Peak || Spacewatch || — || align=right | 6.0 km || 
|-id=743 bgcolor=#E9E9E9
| 281743 ||  || — || December 29, 2008 || Kitt Peak || Spacewatch || — || align=right | 1.1 km || 
|-id=744 bgcolor=#d6d6d6
| 281744 ||  || — || December 29, 2008 || Kitt Peak || Spacewatch || VER || align=right | 4.0 km || 
|-id=745 bgcolor=#d6d6d6
| 281745 ||  || — || December 29, 2008 || Kitt Peak || Spacewatch || — || align=right | 3.2 km || 
|-id=746 bgcolor=#d6d6d6
| 281746 ||  || — || December 30, 2008 || Kitt Peak || Spacewatch || THM || align=right | 2.6 km || 
|-id=747 bgcolor=#d6d6d6
| 281747 ||  || — || December 21, 2008 || Catalina || CSS || — || align=right | 4.0 km || 
|-id=748 bgcolor=#fefefe
| 281748 ||  || — || December 21, 2008 || Kitt Peak || Spacewatch || — || align=right | 1.6 km || 
|-id=749 bgcolor=#d6d6d6
| 281749 ||  || — || January 2, 2009 || Dauban || F. Kugel || VER || align=right | 5.3 km || 
|-id=750 bgcolor=#E9E9E9
| 281750 ||  || — || January 15, 2009 || Kitt Peak || Spacewatch || WIT || align=right | 1.1 km || 
|-id=751 bgcolor=#d6d6d6
| 281751 ||  || — || January 8, 2009 || Kitt Peak || Spacewatch || EMA || align=right | 3.8 km || 
|-id=752 bgcolor=#d6d6d6
| 281752 ||  || — || January 1, 2009 || Kitt Peak || Spacewatch || URS || align=right | 3.8 km || 
|-id=753 bgcolor=#fefefe
| 281753 ||  || — || January 17, 2009 || Socorro || LINEAR || — || align=right | 1.3 km || 
|-id=754 bgcolor=#d6d6d6
| 281754 ||  || — || January 21, 2009 || Socorro || LINEAR || EMA || align=right | 5.3 km || 
|-id=755 bgcolor=#d6d6d6
| 281755 ||  || — || January 16, 2009 || Mount Lemmon || Mount Lemmon Survey || — || align=right | 4.8 km || 
|-id=756 bgcolor=#d6d6d6
| 281756 ||  || — || January 24, 2009 || Purple Mountain || PMO NEO || EUP || align=right | 5.0 km || 
|-id=757 bgcolor=#d6d6d6
| 281757 ||  || — || January 26, 2009 || Mount Lemmon || Mount Lemmon Survey || SYL7:4 || align=right | 6.0 km || 
|-id=758 bgcolor=#d6d6d6
| 281758 ||  || — || January 31, 2009 || Kitt Peak || Spacewatch || — || align=right | 2.5 km || 
|-id=759 bgcolor=#d6d6d6
| 281759 ||  || — || September 21, 2005 || Uccle || T. Pauwels || 3:2 || align=right | 6.6 km || 
|-id=760 bgcolor=#d6d6d6
| 281760 ||  || — || January 18, 2009 || Mount Lemmon || Mount Lemmon Survey || — || align=right | 4.2 km || 
|-id=761 bgcolor=#d6d6d6
| 281761 ||  || — || January 18, 2009 || Socorro || LINEAR || — || align=right | 5.9 km || 
|-id=762 bgcolor=#fefefe
| 281762 ||  || — || February 22, 2009 || Kitt Peak || Spacewatch || NYS || align=right data-sort-value="0.89" | 890 m || 
|-id=763 bgcolor=#fefefe
| 281763 ||  || — || February 22, 2009 || Kitt Peak || Spacewatch || — || align=right | 1.4 km || 
|-id=764 bgcolor=#E9E9E9
| 281764 Schwetzingen ||  ||  || February 24, 2009 || Calar Alto || F. Hormuth || — || align=right | 2.7 km || 
|-id=765 bgcolor=#d6d6d6
| 281765 ||  || — || March 22, 2009 || Catalina || CSS || — || align=right | 4.2 km || 
|-id=766 bgcolor=#d6d6d6
| 281766 ||  || — || March 16, 2009 || Purple Mountain || PMO NEO || — || align=right | 4.5 km || 
|-id=767 bgcolor=#E9E9E9
| 281767 ||  || — || March 19, 2009 || Kitt Peak || Spacewatch || DOR || align=right | 2.7 km || 
|-id=768 bgcolor=#fefefe
| 281768 ||  || — || April 17, 2009 || Kitt Peak || Spacewatch || NYS || align=right | 1.8 km || 
|-id=769 bgcolor=#d6d6d6
| 281769 ||  || — || April 17, 2009 || Kitt Peak || Spacewatch || HYG || align=right | 4.7 km || 
|-id=770 bgcolor=#d6d6d6
| 281770 ||  || — || April 17, 2009 || Catalina || CSS || — || align=right | 4.1 km || 
|-id=771 bgcolor=#E9E9E9
| 281771 ||  || — || March 26, 2003 || Kitt Peak || Spacewatch || — || align=right | 1.1 km || 
|-id=772 bgcolor=#E9E9E9
| 281772 Matttaylor ||  ||  || September 13, 2009 || ESA OGS || M. Busch, R. Kresken || — || align=right | 1.8 km || 
|-id=773 bgcolor=#fefefe
| 281773 ||  || — || September 15, 2009 || Kitt Peak || Spacewatch || — || align=right | 1.0 km || 
|-id=774 bgcolor=#d6d6d6
| 281774 ||  || — || September 15, 2009 || Kitt Peak || Spacewatch || — || align=right | 2.7 km || 
|-id=775 bgcolor=#E9E9E9
| 281775 ||  || — || September 16, 2009 || Kitt Peak || Spacewatch || — || align=right | 3.4 km || 
|-id=776 bgcolor=#E9E9E9
| 281776 ||  || — || September 16, 2009 || Kitt Peak || Spacewatch || — || align=right | 2.1 km || 
|-id=777 bgcolor=#fefefe
| 281777 ||  || — || February 8, 2007 || Mount Lemmon || Mount Lemmon Survey || NYS || align=right data-sort-value="0.60" | 600 m || 
|-id=778 bgcolor=#E9E9E9
| 281778 ||  || — || September 19, 2009 || Catalina || CSS || — || align=right | 2.5 km || 
|-id=779 bgcolor=#fefefe
| 281779 ||  || — || September 21, 2009 || Kitt Peak || Spacewatch || H || align=right data-sort-value="0.75" | 750 m || 
|-id=780 bgcolor=#d6d6d6
| 281780 ||  || — || September 19, 2009 || Catalina || CSS || — || align=right | 3.4 km || 
|-id=781 bgcolor=#d6d6d6
| 281781 ||  || — || September 27, 2009 || Kitt Peak || Spacewatch || — || align=right | 5.5 km || 
|-id=782 bgcolor=#d6d6d6
| 281782 ||  || — || September 16, 2009 || Catalina || CSS || EOS || align=right | 3.7 km || 
|-id=783 bgcolor=#d6d6d6
| 281783 ||  || — || September 28, 2009 || Catalina || CSS || — || align=right | 5.7 km || 
|-id=784 bgcolor=#fefefe
| 281784 ||  || — || September 20, 2009 || Mount Lemmon || Mount Lemmon Survey || fast? || align=right data-sort-value="0.83" | 830 m || 
|-id=785 bgcolor=#d6d6d6
| 281785 ||  || — || October 14, 2009 || La Sagra || OAM Obs. || HYG || align=right | 4.2 km || 
|-id=786 bgcolor=#fefefe
| 281786 ||  || — || October 12, 2009 || Mount Lemmon || Mount Lemmon Survey || — || align=right | 1.5 km || 
|-id=787 bgcolor=#fefefe
| 281787 ||  || — || October 21, 2009 || Mount Lemmon || Mount Lemmon Survey || — || align=right data-sort-value="0.76" | 760 m || 
|-id=788 bgcolor=#fefefe
| 281788 ||  || — || July 27, 2001 || Palomar || NEAT || — || align=right data-sort-value="0.94" | 940 m || 
|-id=789 bgcolor=#fefefe
| 281789 ||  || — || October 22, 2009 || Mount Lemmon || Mount Lemmon Survey || FLO || align=right | 1.5 km || 
|-id=790 bgcolor=#E9E9E9
| 281790 ||  || — || October 18, 2009 || Catalina || CSS || — || align=right | 3.2 km || 
|-id=791 bgcolor=#fefefe
| 281791 ||  || — || October 28, 2009 || La Sagra || OAM Obs. || H || align=right data-sort-value="0.69" | 690 m || 
|-id=792 bgcolor=#fefefe
| 281792 ||  || — || October 21, 2009 || Mount Lemmon || Mount Lemmon Survey || — || align=right | 1.1 km || 
|-id=793 bgcolor=#E9E9E9
| 281793 ||  || — || October 24, 2009 || Kitt Peak || Spacewatch || — || align=right data-sort-value="0.91" | 910 m || 
|-id=794 bgcolor=#E9E9E9
| 281794 ||  || — || January 5, 2002 || Palomar || NEAT || ADE || align=right | 2.8 km || 
|-id=795 bgcolor=#d6d6d6
| 281795 ||  || — || October 24, 2009 || Catalina || CSS || — || align=right | 4.1 km || 
|-id=796 bgcolor=#fefefe
| 281796 ||  || — || November 8, 2009 || Catalina || CSS || — || align=right data-sort-value="0.89" | 890 m || 
|-id=797 bgcolor=#E9E9E9
| 281797 ||  || — || November 9, 2009 || Kitt Peak || Spacewatch || — || align=right | 1.1 km || 
|-id=798 bgcolor=#E9E9E9
| 281798 ||  || — || November 10, 2009 || La Sagra || OAM Obs. || — || align=right | 3.5 km || 
|-id=799 bgcolor=#E9E9E9
| 281799 ||  || — || November 9, 2009 || Mount Lemmon || Mount Lemmon Survey || — || align=right | 1.0 km || 
|-id=800 bgcolor=#fefefe
| 281800 ||  || — || November 8, 2009 || Kitt Peak || Spacewatch || FLO || align=right data-sort-value="0.75" | 750 m || 
|}

281801–281900 

|-bgcolor=#fefefe
| 281801 ||  || — || November 16, 2009 || Kitt Peak || Spacewatch || — || align=right | 1.0 km || 
|-id=802 bgcolor=#fefefe
| 281802 ||  || — || November 17, 2009 || Kitt Peak || Spacewatch || MAS || align=right | 1.0 km || 
|-id=803 bgcolor=#fefefe
| 281803 ||  || — || March 15, 2007 || Mount Lemmon || Mount Lemmon Survey || ERI || align=right | 1.9 km || 
|-id=804 bgcolor=#d6d6d6
| 281804 ||  || — || November 19, 2009 || Kitt Peak || Spacewatch || — || align=right | 3.2 km || 
|-id=805 bgcolor=#E9E9E9
| 281805 ||  || — || November 17, 2009 || Socorro || LINEAR || — || align=right | 1.6 km || 
|-id=806 bgcolor=#fefefe
| 281806 ||  || — || November 18, 2009 || Kitt Peak || Spacewatch || — || align=right data-sort-value="0.85" | 850 m || 
|-id=807 bgcolor=#E9E9E9
| 281807 ||  || — || November 18, 2009 || Kitt Peak || Spacewatch || — || align=right | 1.1 km || 
|-id=808 bgcolor=#fefefe
| 281808 ||  || — || November 21, 2003 || Kitt Peak || M. W. Buie || — || align=right data-sort-value="0.59" | 590 m || 
|-id=809 bgcolor=#d6d6d6
| 281809 ||  || — || November 20, 2009 || Kitt Peak || Spacewatch || — || align=right | 4.0 km || 
|-id=810 bgcolor=#fefefe
| 281810 ||  || — || November 22, 2009 || Kitt Peak || Spacewatch || — || align=right data-sort-value="0.82" | 820 m || 
|-id=811 bgcolor=#fefefe
| 281811 ||  || — || November 26, 2009 || Tzec Maun || Tzec Maun Obs. || FLO || align=right data-sort-value="0.68" | 680 m || 
|-id=812 bgcolor=#fefefe
| 281812 ||  || — || November 21, 2009 || Kitt Peak || Spacewatch || — || align=right | 1.5 km || 
|-id=813 bgcolor=#fefefe
| 281813 ||  || — || November 24, 2009 || Purple Mountain || PMO NEO || — || align=right | 1.2 km || 
|-id=814 bgcolor=#d6d6d6
| 281814 ||  || — || November 16, 2009 || Kitt Peak || Spacewatch || — || align=right | 3.8 km || 
|-id=815 bgcolor=#fefefe
| 281815 ||  || — || November 17, 2009 || Kitt Peak || Spacewatch || — || align=right data-sort-value="0.89" | 890 m || 
|-id=816 bgcolor=#fefefe
| 281816 ||  || — || November 21, 2009 || Kitt Peak || Spacewatch || — || align=right data-sort-value="0.79" | 790 m || 
|-id=817 bgcolor=#E9E9E9
| 281817 ||  || — || November 26, 2009 || Catalina || CSS || JUN || align=right | 1.5 km || 
|-id=818 bgcolor=#E9E9E9
| 281818 ||  || — || November 17, 2009 || Mount Lemmon || Mount Lemmon Survey || — || align=right | 1.5 km || 
|-id=819 bgcolor=#E9E9E9
| 281819 ||  || — || November 24, 2009 || Kitt Peak || Spacewatch || JUN || align=right | 1.8 km || 
|-id=820 bgcolor=#E9E9E9
| 281820 Monnaves ||  ||  || December 9, 2009 || Cabrils || Montcabre Obs. || — || align=right | 1.5 km || 
|-id=821 bgcolor=#fefefe
| 281821 ||  || — || December 10, 2009 || Mount Lemmon || Mount Lemmon Survey || — || align=right | 1.1 km || 
|-id=822 bgcolor=#E9E9E9
| 281822 ||  || — || December 11, 2009 || Socorro || LINEAR || — || align=right | 2.5 km || 
|-id=823 bgcolor=#E9E9E9
| 281823 ||  || — || December 10, 2009 || Mount Lemmon || Mount Lemmon Survey || — || align=right | 1.2 km || 
|-id=824 bgcolor=#E9E9E9
| 281824 ||  || — || December 17, 2009 || Mount Lemmon || Mount Lemmon Survey || — || align=right | 3.7 km || 
|-id=825 bgcolor=#E9E9E9
| 281825 ||  || — || December 18, 2009 || Tzec Maun || Tzec Maun Obs. || RAF || align=right | 1.2 km || 
|-id=826 bgcolor=#E9E9E9
| 281826 ||  || — || December 26, 2009 || Kitt Peak || Spacewatch || HEN || align=right data-sort-value="0.98" | 980 m || 
|-id=827 bgcolor=#E9E9E9
| 281827 ||  || — || December 18, 2009 || Kitt Peak || Spacewatch || HNS || align=right | 1.7 km || 
|-id=828 bgcolor=#fefefe
| 281828 ||  || — || December 19, 2009 || Kitt Peak || Spacewatch || — || align=right | 1.2 km || 
|-id=829 bgcolor=#E9E9E9
| 281829 ||  || — || January 5, 2010 || Kitt Peak || Spacewatch || HNS || align=right | 1.5 km || 
|-id=830 bgcolor=#E9E9E9
| 281830 ||  || — || January 7, 2010 || Mount Lemmon || Mount Lemmon Survey || — || align=right | 1.3 km || 
|-id=831 bgcolor=#d6d6d6
| 281831 ||  || — || January 6, 2010 || Kitt Peak || Spacewatch || — || align=right | 2.5 km || 
|-id=832 bgcolor=#E9E9E9
| 281832 ||  || — || January 11, 2010 || Kitt Peak || Spacewatch || — || align=right | 2.9 km || 
|-id=833 bgcolor=#E9E9E9
| 281833 ||  || — || January 11, 2010 || Kitt Peak || Spacewatch || AGN || align=right | 1.5 km || 
|-id=834 bgcolor=#d6d6d6
| 281834 ||  || — || January 12, 2010 || Kitt Peak || Spacewatch || — || align=right | 4.1 km || 
|-id=835 bgcolor=#d6d6d6
| 281835 ||  || — || January 12, 2010 || Catalina || CSS || — || align=right | 2.7 km || 
|-id=836 bgcolor=#d6d6d6
| 281836 ||  || — || January 12, 2010 || Mount Lemmon || Mount Lemmon Survey || — || align=right | 4.1 km || 
|-id=837 bgcolor=#fefefe
| 281837 ||  || — || January 13, 2010 || Kitt Peak || Spacewatch || V || align=right | 1.1 km || 
|-id=838 bgcolor=#E9E9E9
| 281838 ||  || — || January 13, 2010 || Mount Lemmon || Mount Lemmon Survey || — || align=right | 1.6 km || 
|-id=839 bgcolor=#d6d6d6
| 281839 ||  || — || January 14, 2010 || Kitt Peak || Spacewatch || — || align=right | 4.2 km || 
|-id=840 bgcolor=#E9E9E9
| 281840 ||  || — || January 12, 2010 || Catalina || CSS || — || align=right | 3.2 km || 
|-id=841 bgcolor=#E9E9E9
| 281841 ||  || — || January 8, 2010 || Kitt Peak || Spacewatch || — || align=right | 1.5 km || 
|-id=842 bgcolor=#E9E9E9
| 281842 ||  || — || January 12, 2010 || Kitt Peak || Spacewatch || — || align=right | 3.4 km || 
|-id=843 bgcolor=#d6d6d6
| 281843 ||  || — || February 9, 2010 || Mount Lemmon || Mount Lemmon Survey || KAR || align=right | 1.3 km || 
|-id=844 bgcolor=#d6d6d6
| 281844 ||  || — || February 9, 2010 || Kitt Peak || Spacewatch || EOS || align=right | 2.4 km || 
|-id=845 bgcolor=#d6d6d6
| 281845 ||  || — || February 6, 2010 || Mount Lemmon || Mount Lemmon Survey || — || align=right | 3.2 km || 
|-id=846 bgcolor=#E9E9E9
| 281846 ||  || — || February 5, 2010 || Catalina || CSS || — || align=right | 3.1 km || 
|-id=847 bgcolor=#d6d6d6
| 281847 ||  || — || February 13, 2010 || Calvin-Rehoboth || Calvin–Rehoboth Obs. || TEL || align=right | 1.8 km || 
|-id=848 bgcolor=#fefefe
| 281848 ||  || — || February 12, 2010 || Socorro || LINEAR || — || align=right | 1.1 km || 
|-id=849 bgcolor=#d6d6d6
| 281849 ||  || — || February 9, 2010 || Catalina || CSS || HYG || align=right | 5.1 km || 
|-id=850 bgcolor=#d6d6d6
| 281850 ||  || — || February 10, 2010 || Kitt Peak || Spacewatch || — || align=right | 3.7 km || 
|-id=851 bgcolor=#E9E9E9
| 281851 ||  || — || February 13, 2010 || Mount Lemmon || Mount Lemmon Survey || — || align=right | 3.5 km || 
|-id=852 bgcolor=#d6d6d6
| 281852 ||  || — || February 13, 2010 || Mount Lemmon || Mount Lemmon Survey || EOS || align=right | 2.9 km || 
|-id=853 bgcolor=#E9E9E9
| 281853 ||  || — || February 13, 2010 || Mount Lemmon || Mount Lemmon Survey || HOF || align=right | 3.9 km || 
|-id=854 bgcolor=#d6d6d6
| 281854 ||  || — || February 13, 2010 || Kitt Peak || Spacewatch || — || align=right | 2.9 km || 
|-id=855 bgcolor=#d6d6d6
| 281855 ||  || — || October 2, 2003 || Kitt Peak || Spacewatch || — || align=right | 3.1 km || 
|-id=856 bgcolor=#d6d6d6
| 281856 ||  || — || February 14, 2010 || Mount Lemmon || Mount Lemmon Survey || — || align=right | 3.5 km || 
|-id=857 bgcolor=#d6d6d6
| 281857 ||  || — || February 9, 2010 || Catalina || CSS || HYG || align=right | 3.1 km || 
|-id=858 bgcolor=#d6d6d6
| 281858 ||  || — || February 9, 2010 || Catalina || CSS || — || align=right | 3.9 km || 
|-id=859 bgcolor=#d6d6d6
| 281859 ||  || — || February 15, 2010 || Mount Lemmon || Mount Lemmon Survey || KOR || align=right | 1.6 km || 
|-id=860 bgcolor=#E9E9E9
| 281860 ||  || — || February 9, 2010 || Catalina || CSS || — || align=right | 2.5 km || 
|-id=861 bgcolor=#d6d6d6
| 281861 ||  || — || February 10, 2010 || Kitt Peak || Spacewatch || — || align=right | 3.0 km || 
|-id=862 bgcolor=#d6d6d6
| 281862 ||  || — || February 14, 2010 || Mount Lemmon || Mount Lemmon Survey || — || align=right | 4.2 km || 
|-id=863 bgcolor=#d6d6d6
| 281863 ||  || — || February 9, 2010 || Catalina || CSS || THB || align=right | 3.4 km || 
|-id=864 bgcolor=#d6d6d6
| 281864 ||  || — || February 2, 2010 || WISE || WISE || — || align=right | 5.9 km || 
|-id=865 bgcolor=#E9E9E9
| 281865 ||  || — || February 16, 2010 || Mount Lemmon || Mount Lemmon Survey || HOF || align=right | 3.2 km || 
|-id=866 bgcolor=#d6d6d6
| 281866 ||  || — || February 16, 2010 || Mount Lemmon || Mount Lemmon Survey || — || align=right | 4.6 km || 
|-id=867 bgcolor=#d6d6d6
| 281867 ||  || — || February 17, 2010 || Kitt Peak || Spacewatch || — || align=right | 4.4 km || 
|-id=868 bgcolor=#d6d6d6
| 281868 ||  || — || February 28, 2010 || WISE || WISE || — || align=right | 3.1 km || 
|-id=869 bgcolor=#d6d6d6
| 281869 ||  || — || March 5, 2010 || Farra d'Isonzo || Farra d'Isonzo || — || align=right | 5.4 km || 
|-id=870 bgcolor=#d6d6d6
| 281870 ||  || — || March 10, 2010 || Purple Mountain || PMO NEO || SYL7:4 || align=right | 5.8 km || 
|-id=871 bgcolor=#d6d6d6
| 281871 ||  || — || March 14, 2010 || Mount Lemmon || Mount Lemmon Survey || HYG || align=right | 3.1 km || 
|-id=872 bgcolor=#E9E9E9
| 281872 ||  || — || March 14, 2010 || Kitt Peak || Spacewatch || — || align=right | 3.2 km || 
|-id=873 bgcolor=#fefefe
| 281873 ||  || — || March 14, 2010 || Kitt Peak || Spacewatch || — || align=right | 2.2 km || 
|-id=874 bgcolor=#d6d6d6
| 281874 ||  || — || March 15, 2010 || Mount Lemmon || Mount Lemmon Survey || 7:4 || align=right | 3.9 km || 
|-id=875 bgcolor=#E9E9E9
| 281875 ||  || — || March 15, 2010 || Mount Lemmon || Mount Lemmon Survey || — || align=right | 3.2 km || 
|-id=876 bgcolor=#E9E9E9
| 281876 ||  || — || March 18, 2010 || WISE || WISE || MIT || align=right | 2.5 km || 
|-id=877 bgcolor=#E9E9E9
| 281877 ||  || — || March 19, 2010 || Kitt Peak || Spacewatch || HOF || align=right | 3.8 km || 
|-id=878 bgcolor=#E9E9E9
| 281878 ||  || — || April 7, 2010 || Mount Lemmon || Mount Lemmon Survey || AST || align=right | 2.5 km || 
|-id=879 bgcolor=#E9E9E9
| 281879 ||  || — || October 20, 2003 || Kitt Peak || Spacewatch || HEN || align=right | 1.4 km || 
|-id=880 bgcolor=#d6d6d6
| 281880 Wuweiren ||  ||  || August 16, 2007 || XuYi || Purple Mountain Obs. || URS || align=right | 5.1 km || 
|-id=881 bgcolor=#E9E9E9
| 281881 ||  || — || April 20, 2010 || Kitt Peak || Spacewatch || — || align=right | 2.6 km || 
|-id=882 bgcolor=#d6d6d6
| 281882 ||  || — || April 20, 2010 || Siding Spring || SSS || EUP || align=right | 5.3 km || 
|-id=883 bgcolor=#E9E9E9
| 281883 ||  || — || May 7, 2010 || Kitt Peak || Spacewatch || — || align=right | 3.6 km || 
|-id=884 bgcolor=#fefefe
| 281884 ||  || — || May 6, 2010 || Mount Lemmon || Mount Lemmon Survey || — || align=right | 1.1 km || 
|-id=885 bgcolor=#d6d6d6
| 281885 ||  || — || May 8, 2010 || Mount Lemmon || Mount Lemmon Survey || — || align=right | 3.9 km || 
|-id=886 bgcolor=#d6d6d6
| 281886 ||  || — || May 29, 2010 || WISE || WISE || — || align=right | 5.8 km || 
|-id=887 bgcolor=#E9E9E9
| 281887 ||  || — || June 5, 2010 || Pla D'Arguines || R. Ferrando || — || align=right | 2.3 km || 
|-id=888 bgcolor=#fefefe
| 281888 ||  || — || June 1, 2010 || Kitt Peak || Spacewatch || H || align=right data-sort-value="0.67" | 670 m || 
|-id=889 bgcolor=#E9E9E9
| 281889 ||  || — || June 5, 2010 || Kitt Peak || Spacewatch || NEM || align=right | 3.3 km || 
|-id=890 bgcolor=#E9E9E9
| 281890 ||  || — || July 25, 2010 || WISE || WISE || — || align=right | 3.3 km || 
|-id=891 bgcolor=#d6d6d6
| 281891 ||  || — || June 16, 2009 || Kitt Peak || Spacewatch || — || align=right | 5.5 km || 
|-id=892 bgcolor=#E9E9E9
| 281892 ||  || — || November 16, 2006 || Kitt Peak || Spacewatch || — || align=right | 1.7 km || 
|-id=893 bgcolor=#fefefe
| 281893 ||  || — || October 29, 2002 || Palomar || NEAT || V || align=right data-sort-value="0.66" | 660 m || 
|-id=894 bgcolor=#d6d6d6
| 281894 ||  || — || February 2, 2000 || Kitt Peak || Spacewatch || — || align=right | 4.7 km || 
|-id=895 bgcolor=#d6d6d6
| 281895 ||  || — || December 4, 2005 || Kitt Peak || Spacewatch || — || align=right | 4.0 km || 
|-id=896 bgcolor=#fefefe
| 281896 ||  || — || November 22, 2006 || Mount Lemmon || Mount Lemmon Survey || FLO || align=right data-sort-value="0.63" | 630 m || 
|-id=897 bgcolor=#E9E9E9
| 281897 ||  || — || September 5, 2000 || Kitt Peak || Spacewatch || — || align=right | 1.8 km || 
|-id=898 bgcolor=#d6d6d6
| 281898 ||  || — || May 10, 2007 || Catalina || CSS || — || align=right | 4.5 km || 
|-id=899 bgcolor=#E9E9E9
| 281899 ||  || — || December 6, 2005 || Kitt Peak || Spacewatch || — || align=right | 2.0 km || 
|-id=900 bgcolor=#d6d6d6
| 281900 ||  || — || February 27, 2006 || Kitt Peak || Spacewatch || THM || align=right | 2.4 km || 
|}

281901–282000 

|-bgcolor=#fefefe
| 281901 ||  || — || December 7, 2002 || Kitt Peak || Spacewatch || — || align=right | 1.2 km || 
|-id=902 bgcolor=#fefefe
| 281902 ||  || — || February 3, 2000 || Socorro || LINEAR || V || align=right data-sort-value="0.92" | 920 m || 
|-id=903 bgcolor=#d6d6d6
| 281903 ||  || — || March 2, 2000 || Kitt Peak || Spacewatch || — || align=right | 5.0 km || 
|-id=904 bgcolor=#E9E9E9
| 281904 ||  || — || August 25, 2004 || Kitt Peak || Spacewatch || — || align=right | 2.5 km || 
|-id=905 bgcolor=#d6d6d6
| 281905 ||  || — || May 13, 2007 || Mount Lemmon || Mount Lemmon Survey || — || align=right | 3.7 km || 
|-id=906 bgcolor=#d6d6d6
| 281906 ||  || — || November 25, 2009 || Mount Lemmon || Mount Lemmon Survey || — || align=right | 4.1 km || 
|-id=907 bgcolor=#fefefe
| 281907 ||  || — || October 16, 2006 || Catalina || CSS || V || align=right data-sort-value="0.73" | 730 m || 
|-id=908 bgcolor=#d6d6d6
| 281908 ||  || — || August 11, 1997 || Kitt Peak || Spacewatch || — || align=right | 3.8 km || 
|-id=909 bgcolor=#d6d6d6
| 281909 ||  || — || January 17, 2005 || Kitt Peak || Spacewatch || — || align=right | 3.4 km || 
|-id=910 bgcolor=#d6d6d6
| 281910 ||  || — || October 19, 2003 || Apache Point || SDSS || — || align=right | 3.3 km || 
|-id=911 bgcolor=#d6d6d6
| 281911 ||  || — || March 25, 2006 || Kitt Peak || Spacewatch || — || align=right | 3.2 km || 
|-id=912 bgcolor=#fefefe
| 281912 ||  || — || December 13, 2006 || Kitt Peak || Spacewatch || — || align=right data-sort-value="0.74" | 740 m || 
|-id=913 bgcolor=#fefefe
| 281913 ||  || — || October 9, 1993 || La Silla || E. W. Elst || — || align=right | 1.5 km || 
|-id=914 bgcolor=#fefefe
| 281914 ||  || — || April 9, 2003 || Palomar || NEAT || — || align=right | 2.2 km || 
|-id=915 bgcolor=#fefefe
| 281915 ||  || — || September 23, 2005 || Catalina || CSS || — || align=right data-sort-value="0.87" | 870 m || 
|-id=916 bgcolor=#E9E9E9
| 281916 ||  || — || December 1, 2005 || Mount Lemmon || Mount Lemmon Survey || — || align=right | 2.5 km || 
|-id=917 bgcolor=#d6d6d6
| 281917 ||  || — || November 27, 1998 || Kitt Peak || Spacewatch || EOS || align=right | 2.4 km || 
|-id=918 bgcolor=#E9E9E9
| 281918 ||  || — || April 10, 2003 || Kitt Peak || Spacewatch || — || align=right | 1.6 km || 
|-id=919 bgcolor=#d6d6d6
| 281919 ||  || — || March 17, 2005 || Kitt Peak || Spacewatch || THB || align=right | 3.6 km || 
|-id=920 bgcolor=#d6d6d6
| 281920 ||  || — || September 29, 2008 || Catalina || CSS || — || align=right | 4.2 km || 
|-id=921 bgcolor=#E9E9E9
| 281921 ||  || — || April 8, 2002 || Kitt Peak || Spacewatch || — || align=right | 2.0 km || 
|-id=922 bgcolor=#d6d6d6
| 281922 ||  || — || September 11, 2002 || Palomar || NEAT || — || align=right | 3.2 km || 
|-id=923 bgcolor=#E9E9E9
| 281923 ||  || — || May 1, 1997 || Kitt Peak || Spacewatch || — || align=right | 2.9 km || 
|-id=924 bgcolor=#fefefe
| 281924 ||  || — || December 14, 2001 || Kitt Peak || Spacewatch || V || align=right data-sort-value="0.88" | 880 m || 
|-id=925 bgcolor=#E9E9E9
| 281925 ||  || — || February 6, 2006 || Mount Lemmon || Mount Lemmon Survey || AGN || align=right | 1.4 km || 
|-id=926 bgcolor=#d6d6d6
| 281926 ||  || — || March 13, 2005 || Kitt Peak || Spacewatch || LUT || align=right | 3.5 km || 
|-id=927 bgcolor=#E9E9E9
| 281927 ||  || — || October 16, 1999 || Kitt Peak || Spacewatch || — || align=right | 2.0 km || 
|-id=928 bgcolor=#E9E9E9
| 281928 ||  || — || September 22, 2008 || Kitt Peak || Spacewatch || — || align=right | 2.1 km || 
|-id=929 bgcolor=#d6d6d6
| 281929 ||  || — || November 21, 2003 || Kitt Peak || Spacewatch || — || align=right | 3.7 km || 
|-id=930 bgcolor=#fefefe
| 281930 ||  || — || January 15, 2001 || Kitt Peak || Spacewatch || FLO || align=right data-sort-value="0.73" | 730 m || 
|-id=931 bgcolor=#E9E9E9
| 281931 ||  || — || October 8, 2004 || Kitt Peak || Spacewatch || — || align=right | 1.6 km || 
|-id=932 bgcolor=#fefefe
| 281932 ||  || — || May 14, 2004 || Kitt Peak || Spacewatch || V || align=right data-sort-value="0.56" | 560 m || 
|-id=933 bgcolor=#d6d6d6
| 281933 ||  || — || October 9, 2002 || Socorro || LINEAR || — || align=right | 4.5 km || 
|-id=934 bgcolor=#d6d6d6
| 281934 ||  || — || September 9, 2008 || Mount Lemmon || Mount Lemmon Survey || — || align=right | 2.7 km || 
|-id=935 bgcolor=#d6d6d6
| 281935 ||  || — || September 23, 2008 || Kitt Peak || Spacewatch || — || align=right | 3.2 km || 
|-id=936 bgcolor=#fefefe
| 281936 ||  || — || February 13, 2007 || Mount Lemmon || Mount Lemmon Survey || — || align=right data-sort-value="0.81" | 810 m || 
|-id=937 bgcolor=#E9E9E9
| 281937 ||  || — || April 2, 2006 || Mount Lemmon || Mount Lemmon Survey || — || align=right | 2.8 km || 
|-id=938 bgcolor=#d6d6d6
| 281938 ||  || — || March 3, 2005 || Kitt Peak || Spacewatch || — || align=right | 3.0 km || 
|-id=939 bgcolor=#E9E9E9
| 281939 ||  || — || January 31, 2006 || Mount Lemmon || Mount Lemmon Survey || — || align=right | 2.7 km || 
|-id=940 bgcolor=#E9E9E9
| 281940 ||  || — || September 7, 2004 || Kitt Peak || Spacewatch || GEF || align=right | 1.6 km || 
|-id=941 bgcolor=#E9E9E9
| 281941 ||  || — || October 15, 1995 || Kitt Peak || Spacewatch || — || align=right | 2.4 km || 
|-id=942 bgcolor=#E9E9E9
| 281942 ||  || — || November 30, 2005 || Kitt Peak || Spacewatch || RAF || align=right | 1.3 km || 
|-id=943 bgcolor=#fefefe
| 281943 ||  || — || February 27, 2007 || Kitt Peak || Spacewatch || NYS || align=right data-sort-value="0.62" | 620 m || 
|-id=944 bgcolor=#d6d6d6
| 281944 ||  || — || September 23, 2008 || Mount Lemmon || Mount Lemmon Survey || HYG || align=right | 3.2 km || 
|-id=945 bgcolor=#E9E9E9
| 281945 ||  || — || April 5, 2003 || Anderson Mesa || LONEOS || — || align=right | 1.6 km || 
|-id=946 bgcolor=#E9E9E9
| 281946 ||  || — || March 18, 2002 || Kitt Peak || Spacewatch || WIT || align=right | 1.4 km || 
|-id=947 bgcolor=#fefefe
| 281947 ||  || — || February 29, 2000 || Socorro || LINEAR || NYS || align=right data-sort-value="0.83" | 830 m || 
|-id=948 bgcolor=#E9E9E9
| 281948 ||  || — || April 25, 2007 || Kitt Peak || Spacewatch || — || align=right data-sort-value="0.90" | 900 m || 
|-id=949 bgcolor=#E9E9E9
| 281949 ||  || — || October 9, 2004 || Kitt Peak || Spacewatch || AGN || align=right | 1.3 km || 
|-id=950 bgcolor=#d6d6d6
| 281950 ||  || — || September 5, 2007 || Catalina || CSS || — || align=right | 3.3 km || 
|-id=951 bgcolor=#E9E9E9
| 281951 ||  || — || February 5, 2006 || Mount Lemmon || Mount Lemmon Survey || WIT || align=right | 1.4 km || 
|-id=952 bgcolor=#fefefe
| 281952 ||  || — || March 12, 1996 || Kitt Peak || Spacewatch || — || align=right data-sort-value="0.65" | 650 m || 
|-id=953 bgcolor=#E9E9E9
| 281953 ||  || — || March 5, 2006 || Kitt Peak || Spacewatch || HNA || align=right | 2.9 km || 
|-id=954 bgcolor=#E9E9E9
| 281954 ||  || — || September 29, 2003 || Kitt Peak || Spacewatch || XIZ || align=right | 1.7 km || 
|-id=955 bgcolor=#E9E9E9
| 281955 ||  || — || December 14, 2004 || Kitt Peak || Spacewatch || — || align=right | 3.0 km || 
|-id=956 bgcolor=#d6d6d6
| 281956 ||  || — || February 10, 2005 || Campo Imperatore || CINEOS || — || align=right | 3.3 km || 
|-id=957 bgcolor=#E9E9E9
| 281957 ||  || — || September 23, 2008 || Mount Lemmon || Mount Lemmon Survey || HOF || align=right | 3.2 km || 
|-id=958 bgcolor=#fefefe
| 281958 ||  || — || August 23, 2001 || Kitt Peak || Spacewatch || NYS || align=right data-sort-value="0.65" | 650 m || 
|-id=959 bgcolor=#fefefe
| 281959 ||  || — || March 13, 2003 || Kitt Peak || Spacewatch || NYS || align=right data-sort-value="0.68" | 680 m || 
|-id=960 bgcolor=#fefefe
| 281960 ||  || — || July 27, 2001 || Anderson Mesa || LONEOS || FLO || align=right data-sort-value="0.84" | 840 m || 
|-id=961 bgcolor=#E9E9E9
| 281961 ||  || — || March 11, 2002 || Kitt Peak || Spacewatch || — || align=right | 1.8 km || 
|-id=962 bgcolor=#E9E9E9
| 281962 ||  || — || November 1, 2005 || Mount Lemmon || Mount Lemmon Survey || — || align=right | 1.2 km || 
|-id=963 bgcolor=#E9E9E9
| 281963 ||  || — || October 3, 2008 || Mount Lemmon || Mount Lemmon Survey || — || align=right | 1.6 km || 
|-id=964 bgcolor=#fefefe
| 281964 ||  || — || November 19, 2004 || Catalina || CSS || H || align=right data-sort-value="0.87" | 870 m || 
|-id=965 bgcolor=#E9E9E9
| 281965 ||  || — || February 25, 2007 || Kitt Peak || Spacewatch || BAR || align=right | 1.1 km || 
|-id=966 bgcolor=#E9E9E9
| 281966 ||  || — || December 8, 2005 || Kitt Peak || Spacewatch || ADE || align=right | 2.6 km || 
|-id=967 bgcolor=#d6d6d6
| 281967 ||  || — || August 22, 2007 || Anderson Mesa || LONEOS || — || align=right | 4.4 km || 
|-id=968 bgcolor=#d6d6d6
| 281968 ||  || — || May 24, 2001 || Cerro Tololo || M. W. Buie || THM || align=right | 2.6 km || 
|-id=969 bgcolor=#d6d6d6
| 281969 ||  || — || September 27, 2003 || Kitt Peak || Spacewatch || — || align=right | 3.1 km || 
|-id=970 bgcolor=#E9E9E9
| 281970 ||  || — || August 8, 2007 || Siding Spring || SSS || — || align=right | 2.6 km || 
|-id=971 bgcolor=#fefefe
| 281971 ||  || — || December 1, 2005 || Kitt Peak || Spacewatch || — || align=right | 1.1 km || 
|-id=972 bgcolor=#E9E9E9
| 281972 ||  || — || October 7, 2004 || Kitt Peak || Spacewatch || — || align=right | 3.0 km || 
|-id=973 bgcolor=#E9E9E9
| 281973 ||  || — || December 18, 2004 || Mount Lemmon || Mount Lemmon Survey || — || align=right | 2.3 km || 
|-id=974 bgcolor=#E9E9E9
| 281974 ||  || — || May 3, 2002 || Kitt Peak || Spacewatch || — || align=right | 2.8 km || 
|-id=975 bgcolor=#d6d6d6
| 281975 ||  || — || September 30, 2003 || Kitt Peak || Spacewatch || — || align=right | 3.8 km || 
|-id=976 bgcolor=#d6d6d6
| 281976 ||  || — || June 23, 1995 || Kitt Peak || Spacewatch || URS || align=right | 3.7 km || 
|-id=977 bgcolor=#E9E9E9
| 281977 ||  || — || December 18, 1995 || Kitt Peak || Spacewatch || — || align=right | 3.3 km || 
|-id=978 bgcolor=#fefefe
| 281978 ||  || — || December 21, 2006 || Kitt Peak || Spacewatch || — || align=right data-sort-value="0.96" | 960 m || 
|-id=979 bgcolor=#fefefe
| 281979 ||  || — || June 25, 2000 || Kitt Peak || Spacewatch || — || align=right data-sort-value="0.83" | 830 m || 
|-id=980 bgcolor=#E9E9E9
| 281980 ||  || — || December 2, 2005 || Kitt Peak || Spacewatch || — || align=right | 1.8 km || 
|-id=981 bgcolor=#E9E9E9
| 281981 ||  || — || January 23, 2006 || Kitt Peak || Spacewatch || — || align=right | 2.3 km || 
|-id=982 bgcolor=#d6d6d6
| 281982 ||  || — || January 12, 2004 || Palomar || NEAT || — || align=right | 4.4 km || 
|-id=983 bgcolor=#d6d6d6
| 281983 ||  || — || March 25, 2006 || Kitt Peak || Spacewatch || — || align=right | 2.9 km || 
|-id=984 bgcolor=#E9E9E9
| 281984 ||  || — || February 16, 2002 || Kitt Peak || Spacewatch || — || align=right | 1.7 km || 
|-id=985 bgcolor=#d6d6d6
| 281985 ||  || — || March 9, 2005 || Catalina || CSS || — || align=right | 4.4 km || 
|-id=986 bgcolor=#E9E9E9
| 281986 ||  || — || February 2, 2001 || Kitt Peak || Spacewatch || AST || align=right | 2.3 km || 
|-id=987 bgcolor=#E9E9E9
| 281987 ||  || — || May 22, 2003 || Kitt Peak || Spacewatch || — || align=right | 1.1 km || 
|-id=988 bgcolor=#d6d6d6
| 281988 ||  || — || March 10, 2005 || Catalina || CSS || — || align=right | 4.7 km || 
|-id=989 bgcolor=#fefefe
| 281989 ||  || — || November 23, 1998 || Kitt Peak || Spacewatch || V || align=right data-sort-value="0.70" | 700 m || 
|-id=990 bgcolor=#fefefe
| 281990 ||  || — || October 12, 2001 || Haleakala || NEAT || — || align=right | 1.4 km || 
|-id=991 bgcolor=#E9E9E9
| 281991 ||  || — || February 27, 2006 || Mount Lemmon || Mount Lemmon Survey || — || align=right | 3.2 km || 
|-id=992 bgcolor=#fefefe
| 281992 ||  || — || March 16, 2007 || Catalina || CSS || V || align=right | 1.0 km || 
|-id=993 bgcolor=#fefefe
| 281993 ||  || — || October 20, 1995 || Kitt Peak || Spacewatch || FLO || align=right data-sort-value="0.78" | 780 m || 
|-id=994 bgcolor=#fefefe
| 281994 ||  || — || January 31, 2003 || Palomar || NEAT || V || align=right data-sort-value="0.95" | 950 m || 
|-id=995 bgcolor=#fefefe
| 281995 ||  || — || April 20, 1996 || Kitt Peak || Spacewatch || — || align=right | 1.0 km || 
|-id=996 bgcolor=#d6d6d6
| 281996 ||  || — || March 3, 2005 || Kitt Peak || Spacewatch || VER || align=right | 3.7 km || 
|-id=997 bgcolor=#d6d6d6
| 281997 ||  || — || August 1, 2001 || Palomar || NEAT || — || align=right | 3.9 km || 
|-id=998 bgcolor=#fefefe
| 281998 ||  || — || September 21, 2001 || Palomar || NEAT || — || align=right data-sort-value="0.96" | 960 m || 
|-id=999 bgcolor=#E9E9E9
| 281999 ||  || — || November 11, 2004 || Catalina || CSS || — || align=right | 2.3 km || 
|-id=000 bgcolor=#d6d6d6
| 282000 ||  || — || December 18, 2003 || Kitt Peak || Spacewatch || — || align=right | 3.9 km || 
|}

References

External links 
 Discovery Circumstances: Numbered Minor Planets (280001)–(285000) (IAU Minor Planet Center)

0281